

366001–366100 

|-bgcolor=#d6d6d6
| 366001 ||  || — || December 24, 2006 || Kitt Peak || Spacewatch || KAR || align=right | 1.2 km || 
|-id=002 bgcolor=#d6d6d6
| 366002 ||  || — || November 12, 2005 || Kitt Peak || Spacewatch || — || align=right | 2.2 km || 
|-id=003 bgcolor=#d6d6d6
| 366003 ||  || — || November 27, 2006 || Mount Lemmon || Mount Lemmon Survey || — || align=right | 2.7 km || 
|-id=004 bgcolor=#E9E9E9
| 366004 ||  || — || November 12, 2006 || Mount Lemmon || Mount Lemmon Survey || — || align=right | 2.2 km || 
|-id=005 bgcolor=#E9E9E9
| 366005 ||  || — || March 6, 2008 || Mount Lemmon || Mount Lemmon Survey || — || align=right | 2.5 km || 
|-id=006 bgcolor=#d6d6d6
| 366006 ||  || — || November 6, 2010 || Mount Lemmon || Mount Lemmon Survey || — || align=right | 3.1 km || 
|-id=007 bgcolor=#d6d6d6
| 366007 ||  || — || January 23, 2006 || Mount Lemmon || Mount Lemmon Survey || — || align=right | 3.5 km || 
|-id=008 bgcolor=#d6d6d6
| 366008 ||  || — || December 27, 2005 || Kitt Peak || Spacewatch || — || align=right | 3.1 km || 
|-id=009 bgcolor=#d6d6d6
| 366009 ||  || — || January 19, 2012 || Kitt Peak || Spacewatch || EOS || align=right | 2.3 km || 
|-id=010 bgcolor=#E9E9E9
| 366010 ||  || — || February 13, 2008 || Kitt Peak || Spacewatch || — || align=right | 2.4 km || 
|-id=011 bgcolor=#E9E9E9
| 366011 ||  || — || December 4, 2007 || Mount Lemmon || Mount Lemmon Survey || HNS || align=right | 1.2 km || 
|-id=012 bgcolor=#fefefe
| 366012 ||  || — || October 19, 2003 || Palomar || NEAT || — || align=right data-sort-value="0.92" | 920 m || 
|-id=013 bgcolor=#d6d6d6
| 366013 ||  || — || January 29, 2012 || Kitt Peak || Spacewatch || — || align=right | 3.8 km || 
|-id=014 bgcolor=#d6d6d6
| 366014 ||  || — || December 27, 2006 || Mount Lemmon || Mount Lemmon Survey || — || align=right | 5.7 km || 
|-id=015 bgcolor=#d6d6d6
| 366015 ||  || — || January 26, 2000 || Kitt Peak || Spacewatch || — || align=right | 3.1 km || 
|-id=016 bgcolor=#d6d6d6
| 366016 ||  || — || September 18, 2009 || Mount Lemmon || Mount Lemmon Survey || — || align=right | 3.0 km || 
|-id=017 bgcolor=#d6d6d6
| 366017 ||  || — || January 21, 2001 || Socorro || LINEAR || EUP || align=right | 4.1 km || 
|-id=018 bgcolor=#E9E9E9
| 366018 ||  || — || February 3, 2008 || Catalina || CSS || — || align=right | 1.5 km || 
|-id=019 bgcolor=#E9E9E9
| 366019 ||  || — || November 13, 2006 || Catalina || CSS || — || align=right | 1.8 km || 
|-id=020 bgcolor=#d6d6d6
| 366020 ||  || — || December 4, 2005 || Kitt Peak || Spacewatch || — || align=right | 3.4 km || 
|-id=021 bgcolor=#fefefe
| 366021 ||  || — || December 19, 2003 || Socorro || LINEAR || — || align=right | 1.3 km || 
|-id=022 bgcolor=#d6d6d6
| 366022 ||  || — || December 5, 2005 || Kitt Peak || Spacewatch || EOS || align=right | 2.6 km || 
|-id=023 bgcolor=#E9E9E9
| 366023 ||  || — || November 22, 2006 || Kitt Peak || Spacewatch || WAT || align=right | 2.3 km || 
|-id=024 bgcolor=#d6d6d6
| 366024 ||  || — || December 25, 2005 || Kitt Peak || Spacewatch || — || align=right | 2.6 km || 
|-id=025 bgcolor=#fefefe
| 366025 ||  || — || December 3, 2007 || Kitt Peak || Spacewatch || — || align=right | 1.0 km || 
|-id=026 bgcolor=#d6d6d6
| 366026 ||  || — || March 11, 2007 || Kitt Peak || Spacewatch || HYG || align=right | 2.7 km || 
|-id=027 bgcolor=#d6d6d6
| 366027 ||  || — || September 20, 2009 || Mount Lemmon || Mount Lemmon Survey || — || align=right | 3.1 km || 
|-id=028 bgcolor=#E9E9E9
| 366028 ||  || — || August 26, 2005 || Palomar || NEAT || WIT || align=right | 1.1 km || 
|-id=029 bgcolor=#d6d6d6
| 366029 ||  || — || November 10, 2005 || Mount Lemmon || Mount Lemmon Survey || HYG || align=right | 3.0 km || 
|-id=030 bgcolor=#d6d6d6
| 366030 ||  || — || September 5, 1999 || Kitt Peak || Spacewatch || — || align=right | 2.7 km || 
|-id=031 bgcolor=#E9E9E9
| 366031 ||  || — || April 21, 2004 || Catalina || CSS || — || align=right | 2.3 km || 
|-id=032 bgcolor=#d6d6d6
| 366032 ||  || — || November 26, 2005 || Mount Lemmon || Mount Lemmon Survey || KOR || align=right | 1.3 km || 
|-id=033 bgcolor=#E9E9E9
| 366033 ||  || — || October 5, 2005 || Kitt Peak || Spacewatch || — || align=right | 1.8 km || 
|-id=034 bgcolor=#E9E9E9
| 366034 ||  || — || March 12, 2008 || Kitt Peak || Spacewatch || MRX || align=right | 1.1 km || 
|-id=035 bgcolor=#d6d6d6
| 366035 ||  || — || January 21, 2012 || Kitt Peak || Spacewatch || — || align=right | 3.1 km || 
|-id=036 bgcolor=#d6d6d6
| 366036 ||  || — || February 26, 2007 || Mount Lemmon || Mount Lemmon Survey || — || align=right | 3.5 km || 
|-id=037 bgcolor=#d6d6d6
| 366037 ||  || — || March 11, 2007 || Kitt Peak || Spacewatch || — || align=right | 3.3 km || 
|-id=038 bgcolor=#d6d6d6
| 366038 ||  || — || October 24, 2005 || Kitt Peak || Spacewatch || — || align=right | 2.6 km || 
|-id=039 bgcolor=#E9E9E9
| 366039 ||  || — || February 2, 2008 || Mount Lemmon || Mount Lemmon Survey || — || align=right | 1.1 km || 
|-id=040 bgcolor=#d6d6d6
| 366040 ||  || — || November 4, 1999 || Kitt Peak || Spacewatch || HYG || align=right | 2.9 km || 
|-id=041 bgcolor=#E9E9E9
| 366041 ||  || — || November 16, 2006 || Catalina || CSS || MAR || align=right | 1.5 km || 
|-id=042 bgcolor=#E9E9E9
| 366042 ||  || — || October 5, 2005 || Kitt Peak || Spacewatch || PAD || align=right | 1.9 km || 
|-id=043 bgcolor=#d6d6d6
| 366043 ||  || — || July 14, 2010 || WISE || WISE || — || align=right | 4.2 km || 
|-id=044 bgcolor=#E9E9E9
| 366044 ||  || — || September 19, 2006 || Catalina || CSS || — || align=right | 1.4 km || 
|-id=045 bgcolor=#d6d6d6
| 366045 ||  || — || October 28, 2005 || Mount Lemmon || Mount Lemmon Survey || — || align=right | 4.3 km || 
|-id=046 bgcolor=#d6d6d6
| 366046 ||  || — || July 5, 2003 || Kitt Peak || Spacewatch || — || align=right | 4.0 km || 
|-id=047 bgcolor=#E9E9E9
| 366047 ||  || — || April 24, 2008 || Mount Lemmon || Mount Lemmon Survey || AGN || align=right | 1.2 km || 
|-id=048 bgcolor=#E9E9E9
| 366048 ||  || — || February 2, 2008 || Mount Lemmon || Mount Lemmon Survey || HEN || align=right | 1.1 km || 
|-id=049 bgcolor=#d6d6d6
| 366049 ||  || — || December 28, 2005 || Mount Lemmon || Mount Lemmon Survey || — || align=right | 2.8 km || 
|-id=050 bgcolor=#d6d6d6
| 366050 ||  || — || January 4, 2006 || Kitt Peak || Spacewatch || — || align=right | 3.1 km || 
|-id=051 bgcolor=#d6d6d6
| 366051 ||  || — || February 21, 2007 || Kitt Peak || Spacewatch || — || align=right | 2.8 km || 
|-id=052 bgcolor=#E9E9E9
| 366052 ||  || — || October 29, 2010 || Mount Lemmon || Mount Lemmon Survey || HOF || align=right | 3.2 km || 
|-id=053 bgcolor=#d6d6d6
| 366053 ||  || — || December 2, 2010 || Mount Lemmon || Mount Lemmon Survey || — || align=right | 2.9 km || 
|-id=054 bgcolor=#d6d6d6
| 366054 ||  || — || April 11, 2007 || Catalina || CSS || — || align=right | 4.1 km || 
|-id=055 bgcolor=#d6d6d6
| 366055 ||  || — || October 7, 2004 || Kitt Peak || Spacewatch || — || align=right | 3.2 km || 
|-id=056 bgcolor=#d6d6d6
| 366056 ||  || — || December 27, 2005 || Kitt Peak || Spacewatch || — || align=right | 4.2 km || 
|-id=057 bgcolor=#d6d6d6
| 366057 ||  || — || February 10, 2007 || Catalina || CSS || — || align=right | 3.5 km || 
|-id=058 bgcolor=#d6d6d6
| 366058 ||  || — || July 24, 2003 || Palomar || NEAT || — || align=right | 3.6 km || 
|-id=059 bgcolor=#d6d6d6
| 366059 ||  || — || August 17, 2009 || Kitt Peak || Spacewatch || EOS || align=right | 2.2 km || 
|-id=060 bgcolor=#fefefe
| 366060 ||  || — || June 25, 1998 || Kitt Peak || Spacewatch || — || align=right data-sort-value="0.86" | 860 m || 
|-id=061 bgcolor=#d6d6d6
| 366061 ||  || — || January 15, 2007 || Anderson Mesa || LONEOS || 615 || align=right | 1.9 km || 
|-id=062 bgcolor=#d6d6d6
| 366062 ||  || — || April 3, 2008 || Mount Lemmon || Mount Lemmon Survey || — || align=right | 3.2 km || 
|-id=063 bgcolor=#E9E9E9
| 366063 ||  || — || October 1, 2005 || Mount Lemmon || Mount Lemmon Survey || WIT || align=right | 1.2 km || 
|-id=064 bgcolor=#E9E9E9
| 366064 ||  || — || September 17, 2006 || Kitt Peak || Spacewatch || — || align=right | 1.2 km || 
|-id=065 bgcolor=#d6d6d6
| 366065 ||  || — || November 3, 2010 || Kitt Peak || Spacewatch || — || align=right | 2.6 km || 
|-id=066 bgcolor=#fefefe
| 366066 ||  || — || July 9, 2003 || Kitt Peak || Spacewatch || — || align=right data-sort-value="0.86" | 860 m || 
|-id=067 bgcolor=#d6d6d6
| 366067 ||  || — || November 1, 2005 || Mount Lemmon || Mount Lemmon Survey || — || align=right | 2.5 km || 
|-id=068 bgcolor=#d6d6d6
| 366068 ||  || — || November 11, 2005 || Kitt Peak || Spacewatch || — || align=right | 3.0 km || 
|-id=069 bgcolor=#E9E9E9
| 366069 ||  || — || November 17, 2006 || Mount Lemmon || Mount Lemmon Survey || — || align=right | 2.4 km || 
|-id=070 bgcolor=#d6d6d6
| 366070 ||  || — || December 20, 1995 || Kitt Peak || Spacewatch || — || align=right | 3.2 km || 
|-id=071 bgcolor=#d6d6d6
| 366071 ||  || — || April 24, 2008 || Mount Lemmon || Mount Lemmon Survey || CHA || align=right | 1.8 km || 
|-id=072 bgcolor=#d6d6d6
| 366072 ||  || — || February 17, 2007 || Mount Lemmon || Mount Lemmon Survey || EOS || align=right | 2.5 km || 
|-id=073 bgcolor=#d6d6d6
| 366073 ||  || — || December 15, 2006 || Mount Lemmon || Mount Lemmon Survey || CHA || align=right | 2.3 km || 
|-id=074 bgcolor=#E9E9E9
| 366074 ||  || — || March 10, 2008 || Mount Lemmon || Mount Lemmon Survey || — || align=right | 2.3 km || 
|-id=075 bgcolor=#d6d6d6
| 366075 ||  || — || November 11, 2010 || Mount Lemmon || Mount Lemmon Survey || THM || align=right | 2.2 km || 
|-id=076 bgcolor=#E9E9E9
| 366076 ||  || — || April 4, 2008 || Kitt Peak || Spacewatch || AGN || align=right | 1.3 km || 
|-id=077 bgcolor=#E9E9E9
| 366077 ||  || — || March 24, 2003 || Kitt Peak || Spacewatch || — || align=right | 2.3 km || 
|-id=078 bgcolor=#E9E9E9
| 366078 ||  || — || April 22, 2009 || Mount Lemmon || Mount Lemmon Survey || — || align=right | 3.1 km || 
|-id=079 bgcolor=#d6d6d6
| 366079 ||  || — || September 19, 2003 || Kitt Peak || Spacewatch || TIR || align=right | 3.6 km || 
|-id=080 bgcolor=#d6d6d6
| 366080 ||  || — || February 26, 2007 || Mount Lemmon || Mount Lemmon Survey || — || align=right | 3.4 km || 
|-id=081 bgcolor=#d6d6d6
| 366081 ||  || — || November 30, 1999 || Kitt Peak || Spacewatch || — || align=right | 3.1 km || 
|-id=082 bgcolor=#d6d6d6
| 366082 ||  || — || December 2, 2005 || Kitt Peak || Spacewatch || — || align=right | 3.4 km || 
|-id=083 bgcolor=#d6d6d6
| 366083 ||  || — || November 1, 2005 || Mount Lemmon || Mount Lemmon Survey || — || align=right | 2.7 km || 
|-id=084 bgcolor=#d6d6d6
| 366084 ||  || — || October 5, 2004 || Kitt Peak || Spacewatch || — || align=right | 2.9 km || 
|-id=085 bgcolor=#E9E9E9
| 366085 ||  || — || March 6, 1999 || Kitt Peak || Spacewatch || — || align=right | 1.9 km || 
|-id=086 bgcolor=#d6d6d6
| 366086 ||  || — || February 9, 2007 || Kitt Peak || Spacewatch || — || align=right | 2.9 km || 
|-id=087 bgcolor=#E9E9E9
| 366087 ||  || — || July 30, 2005 || Palomar || NEAT || — || align=right | 1.8 km || 
|-id=088 bgcolor=#d6d6d6
| 366088 ||  || — || December 30, 2005 || Kitt Peak || Spacewatch || — || align=right | 3.6 km || 
|-id=089 bgcolor=#d6d6d6
| 366089 ||  || — || August 23, 2003 || Palomar || NEAT || — || align=right | 3.5 km || 
|-id=090 bgcolor=#E9E9E9
| 366090 ||  || — || March 20, 1999 || Apache Point || SDSS || — || align=right | 2.9 km || 
|-id=091 bgcolor=#d6d6d6
| 366091 ||  || — || March 19, 2007 || Mount Lemmon || Mount Lemmon Survey || — || align=right | 2.9 km || 
|-id=092 bgcolor=#d6d6d6
| 366092 ||  || — || November 30, 2010 || Mount Lemmon || Mount Lemmon Survey || — || align=right | 2.7 km || 
|-id=093 bgcolor=#E9E9E9
| 366093 ||  || — || October 28, 2006 || Catalina || CSS || — || align=right | 1.5 km || 
|-id=094 bgcolor=#d6d6d6
| 366094 ||  || — || April 16, 2007 || Catalina || CSS || — || align=right | 3.1 km || 
|-id=095 bgcolor=#E9E9E9
| 366095 ||  || — || November 19, 2006 || Catalina || CSS || — || align=right | 2.1 km || 
|-id=096 bgcolor=#d6d6d6
| 366096 ||  || — || September 11, 2004 || Kitt Peak || Spacewatch || — || align=right | 2.5 km || 
|-id=097 bgcolor=#E9E9E9
| 366097 ||  || — || January 23, 2004 || Socorro || LINEAR || MAR || align=right | 1.4 km || 
|-id=098 bgcolor=#d6d6d6
| 366098 ||  || — || March 14, 2007 || Anderson Mesa || LONEOS || ALA || align=right | 4.4 km || 
|-id=099 bgcolor=#fefefe
| 366099 ||  || — || July 15, 2009 || La Sagra || OAM Obs. || NYS || align=right data-sort-value="0.82" | 820 m || 
|-id=100 bgcolor=#E9E9E9
| 366100 ||  || — || March 5, 2008 || Mount Lemmon || Mount Lemmon Survey || WIT || align=right | 1.1 km || 
|}

366101–366200 

|-bgcolor=#d6d6d6
| 366101 ||  || — || November 12, 2010 || Mount Lemmon || Mount Lemmon Survey || — || align=right | 3.7 km || 
|-id=102 bgcolor=#d6d6d6
| 366102 ||  || — || January 23, 2006 || Mount Lemmon || Mount Lemmon Survey || — || align=right | 3.2 km || 
|-id=103 bgcolor=#E9E9E9
| 366103 ||  || — || March 10, 2008 || Catalina || CSS || — || align=right | 1.7 km || 
|-id=104 bgcolor=#d6d6d6
| 366104 ||  || — || March 10, 2007 || Mount Lemmon || Mount Lemmon Survey || EOS || align=right | 2.1 km || 
|-id=105 bgcolor=#d6d6d6
| 366105 ||  || — || April 25, 2007 || Mount Lemmon || Mount Lemmon Survey || Tj (2.96) || align=right | 3.6 km || 
|-id=106 bgcolor=#d6d6d6
| 366106 ||  || — || September 17, 2004 || Anderson Mesa || LONEOS || — || align=right | 4.2 km || 
|-id=107 bgcolor=#d6d6d6
| 366107 ||  || — || October 29, 2003 || Kitt Peak || Spacewatch || 7:4 || align=right | 5.1 km || 
|-id=108 bgcolor=#d6d6d6
| 366108 ||  || — || February 17, 2007 || Mount Lemmon || Mount Lemmon Survey || — || align=right | 2.5 km || 
|-id=109 bgcolor=#d6d6d6
| 366109 ||  || — || September 19, 1998 || Apache Point || SDSS || LIX || align=right | 4.3 km || 
|-id=110 bgcolor=#d6d6d6
| 366110 ||  || — || April 14, 1996 || Kitt Peak || Spacewatch || — || align=right | 3.9 km || 
|-id=111 bgcolor=#d6d6d6
| 366111 ||  || — || April 19, 2007 || Anderson Mesa || LONEOS || — || align=right | 4.0 km || 
|-id=112 bgcolor=#E9E9E9
| 366112 ||  || — || March 1, 1998 || Caussols || ODAS || GAL || align=right | 1.7 km || 
|-id=113 bgcolor=#d6d6d6
| 366113 ||  || — || December 23, 2000 || Apache Point || SDSS || — || align=right | 3.4 km || 
|-id=114 bgcolor=#d6d6d6
| 366114 ||  || — || January 7, 2006 || Kitt Peak || Spacewatch || — || align=right | 4.5 km || 
|-id=115 bgcolor=#d6d6d6
| 366115 ||  || — || September 19, 2003 || Palomar || NEAT || — || align=right | 4.4 km || 
|-id=116 bgcolor=#d6d6d6
| 366116 ||  || — || August 10, 2004 || Campo Imperatore || CINEOS || — || align=right | 3.5 km || 
|-id=117 bgcolor=#E9E9E9
| 366117 ||  || — || October 27, 2005 || Kitt Peak || Spacewatch || HEN || align=right | 1.4 km || 
|-id=118 bgcolor=#d6d6d6
| 366118 ||  || — || November 30, 2010 || Catalina || CSS || — || align=right | 4.2 km || 
|-id=119 bgcolor=#d6d6d6
| 366119 ||  || — || September 18, 2003 || Palomar || NEAT || — || align=right | 4.5 km || 
|-id=120 bgcolor=#d6d6d6
| 366120 ||  || — || March 12, 2007 || Kitt Peak || Spacewatch || HYG || align=right | 2.5 km || 
|-id=121 bgcolor=#d6d6d6
| 366121 ||  || — || September 19, 1998 || Apache Point || SDSS || — || align=right | 3.3 km || 
|-id=122 bgcolor=#d6d6d6
| 366122 ||  || — || February 24, 2006 || Catalina || CSS || EUP || align=right | 3.5 km || 
|-id=123 bgcolor=#d6d6d6
| 366123 ||  || — || September 29, 2003 || Kitt Peak || Spacewatch || THM || align=right | 3.1 km || 
|-id=124 bgcolor=#d6d6d6
| 366124 ||  || — || March 14, 2007 || Kitt Peak || Spacewatch || — || align=right | 3.1 km || 
|-id=125 bgcolor=#fefefe
| 366125 ||  || — || November 4, 2004 || Kitt Peak || Spacewatch || — || align=right data-sort-value="0.65" | 650 m || 
|-id=126 bgcolor=#fefefe
| 366126 ||  || — || September 15, 2007 || Kitt Peak || Spacewatch || — || align=right data-sort-value="0.68" | 680 m || 
|-id=127 bgcolor=#d6d6d6
| 366127 ||  || — || March 11, 2007 || Kitt Peak || Spacewatch || EOS || align=right | 2.0 km || 
|-id=128 bgcolor=#d6d6d6
| 366128 ||  || — || September 19, 1998 || Apache Point || SDSS || — || align=right | 4.5 km || 
|-id=129 bgcolor=#d6d6d6
| 366129 ||  || — || November 17, 1999 || Kitt Peak || Spacewatch || — || align=right | 3.0 km || 
|-id=130 bgcolor=#d6d6d6
| 366130 ||  || — || February 21, 2007 || Kitt Peak || Spacewatch || — || align=right | 2.8 km || 
|-id=131 bgcolor=#E9E9E9
| 366131 ||  || — || September 27, 1992 || Kitt Peak || Spacewatch || HEN || align=right | 1.1 km || 
|-id=132 bgcolor=#d6d6d6
| 366132 ||  || — || December 25, 2005 || Kitt Peak || Spacewatch || — || align=right | 2.4 km || 
|-id=133 bgcolor=#fefefe
| 366133 ||  || — || September 27, 2003 || Kitt Peak || Spacewatch || NYS || align=right data-sort-value="0.77" | 770 m || 
|-id=134 bgcolor=#d6d6d6
| 366134 ||  || — || April 12, 2002 || Palomar || NEAT || — || align=right | 3.4 km || 
|-id=135 bgcolor=#d6d6d6
| 366135 ||  || — || December 27, 2005 || Catalina || CSS || — || align=right | 2.9 km || 
|-id=136 bgcolor=#E9E9E9
| 366136 ||  || — || November 23, 2006 || Mount Lemmon || Mount Lemmon Survey || PAD || align=right | 1.9 km || 
|-id=137 bgcolor=#d6d6d6
| 366137 ||  || — || February 10, 2002 || Socorro || LINEAR || TRP || align=right | 4.5 km || 
|-id=138 bgcolor=#E9E9E9
| 366138 ||  || — || September 9, 2001 || Palomar || NEAT || — || align=right | 3.8 km || 
|-id=139 bgcolor=#E9E9E9
| 366139 ||  || — || August 31, 2005 || Kitt Peak || Spacewatch || — || align=right | 2.0 km || 
|-id=140 bgcolor=#fefefe
| 366140 ||  || — || March 7, 2005 || Socorro || LINEAR || — || align=right | 1.1 km || 
|-id=141 bgcolor=#E9E9E9
| 366141 ||  || — || August 26, 2005 || Palomar || NEAT || — || align=right | 2.2 km || 
|-id=142 bgcolor=#E9E9E9
| 366142 ||  || — || June 29, 2005 || Kitt Peak || Spacewatch || — || align=right | 1.9 km || 
|-id=143 bgcolor=#E9E9E9
| 366143 ||  || — || August 28, 2005 || Kitt Peak || Spacewatch || — || align=right | 1.9 km || 
|-id=144 bgcolor=#d6d6d6
| 366144 ||  || — || December 22, 2005 || Catalina || CSS || — || align=right | 2.9 km || 
|-id=145 bgcolor=#d6d6d6
| 366145 ||  || — || February 1, 2000 || Kitt Peak || Spacewatch || — || align=right | 3.9 km || 
|-id=146 bgcolor=#E9E9E9
| 366146 ||  || — || May 11, 2007 || Mount Lemmon || Mount Lemmon Survey || GAL || align=right | 2.3 km || 
|-id=147 bgcolor=#d6d6d6
| 366147 ||  || — || January 9, 2006 || Kitt Peak || Spacewatch || THM || align=right | 2.1 km || 
|-id=148 bgcolor=#d6d6d6
| 366148 ||  || — || February 26, 2007 || Mount Lemmon || Mount Lemmon Survey || — || align=right | 4.0 km || 
|-id=149 bgcolor=#d6d6d6
| 366149 ||  || — || October 2, 2009 || Mount Lemmon || Mount Lemmon Survey || URS || align=right | 5.0 km || 
|-id=150 bgcolor=#fefefe
| 366150 ||  || — || September 19, 2003 || Kitt Peak || Spacewatch || — || align=right | 1.0 km || 
|-id=151 bgcolor=#d6d6d6
| 366151 ||  || — || February 20, 2006 || Socorro || LINEAR || VER || align=right | 4.4 km || 
|-id=152 bgcolor=#d6d6d6
| 366152 ||  || — || August 25, 2004 || Kitt Peak || Spacewatch || — || align=right | 3.1 km || 
|-id=153 bgcolor=#d6d6d6
| 366153 ||  || — || October 2, 2010 || Mount Lemmon || Mount Lemmon Survey || EOS || align=right | 2.1 km || 
|-id=154 bgcolor=#E9E9E9
| 366154 ||  || — || January 6, 2003 || Nogales || P. R. Holvorcem, M. Schwartz || MAR || align=right | 1.6 km || 
|-id=155 bgcolor=#E9E9E9
| 366155 ||  || — || July 8, 1997 || Kitt Peak || Spacewatch || KON || align=right | 2.9 km || 
|-id=156 bgcolor=#d6d6d6
| 366156 ||  || — || August 15, 2009 || Kitt Peak || Spacewatch || — || align=right | 3.3 km || 
|-id=157 bgcolor=#E9E9E9
| 366157 ||  || — || August 27, 2009 || Kitt Peak || Spacewatch || — || align=right | 2.3 km || 
|-id=158 bgcolor=#d6d6d6
| 366158 ||  || — || September 10, 2004 || Kitt Peak || Spacewatch || EOS || align=right | 2.2 km || 
|-id=159 bgcolor=#d6d6d6
| 366159 ||  || — || March 10, 2007 || Kitt Peak || Spacewatch || — || align=right | 3.3 km || 
|-id=160 bgcolor=#d6d6d6
| 366160 ||  || — || July 20, 2002 || Palomar || NEAT || EUP || align=right | 4.2 km || 
|-id=161 bgcolor=#E9E9E9
| 366161 ||  || — || December 14, 2006 || Kitt Peak || Spacewatch || — || align=right | 1.6 km || 
|-id=162 bgcolor=#E9E9E9
| 366162 ||  || — || September 15, 2009 || Kitt Peak || Spacewatch || — || align=right | 3.0 km || 
|-id=163 bgcolor=#d6d6d6
| 366163 ||  || — || March 10, 2000 || Kitt Peak || Spacewatch || 7:4 || align=right | 5.0 km || 
|-id=164 bgcolor=#E9E9E9
| 366164 ||  || — || February 8, 2002 || Kitt Peak || Spacewatch || — || align=right | 3.2 km || 
|-id=165 bgcolor=#d6d6d6
| 366165 ||  || — || March 15, 2007 || Mount Lemmon || Mount Lemmon Survey || EOS || align=right | 2.3 km || 
|-id=166 bgcolor=#d6d6d6
| 366166 ||  || — || September 30, 2003 || Kitt Peak || Spacewatch || EOS || align=right | 2.3 km || 
|-id=167 bgcolor=#d6d6d6
| 366167 ||  || — || September 17, 1998 || Caussols || ODAS || — || align=right | 3.0 km || 
|-id=168 bgcolor=#d6d6d6
| 366168 ||  || — || March 19, 2001 || Anderson Mesa || LONEOS || EOS || align=right | 3.0 km || 
|-id=169 bgcolor=#E9E9E9
| 366169 ||  || — || March 14, 1999 || Kitt Peak || Spacewatch || — || align=right | 1.5 km || 
|-id=170 bgcolor=#d6d6d6
| 366170 ||  || — || April 24, 2007 || Mount Lemmon || Mount Lemmon Survey || — || align=right | 3.5 km || 
|-id=171 bgcolor=#d6d6d6
| 366171 ||  || — || April 22, 2007 || Kitt Peak || Spacewatch || EOS || align=right | 2.7 km || 
|-id=172 bgcolor=#E9E9E9
| 366172 ||  || — || February 9, 2007 || Catalina || CSS || — || align=right | 3.5 km || 
|-id=173 bgcolor=#d6d6d6
| 366173 ||  || — || October 7, 2004 || Kitt Peak || Spacewatch || — || align=right | 3.4 km || 
|-id=174 bgcolor=#d6d6d6
| 366174 ||  || — || November 6, 2010 || Catalina || CSS || — || align=right | 3.7 km || 
|-id=175 bgcolor=#E9E9E9
| 366175 ||  || — || February 10, 1999 || Socorro || LINEAR || BAR || align=right | 1.7 km || 
|-id=176 bgcolor=#E9E9E9
| 366176 ||  || — || October 12, 2005 || Kitt Peak || Spacewatch || — || align=right | 2.7 km || 
|-id=177 bgcolor=#E9E9E9
| 366177 ||  || — || October 31, 2006 || Mount Lemmon || Mount Lemmon Survey || — || align=right | 1.9 km || 
|-id=178 bgcolor=#fefefe
| 366178 ||  || — || October 16, 2003 || Kitt Peak || Spacewatch || — || align=right data-sort-value="0.67" | 670 m || 
|-id=179 bgcolor=#E9E9E9
| 366179 ||  || — || April 14, 2008 || Catalina || CSS || — || align=right | 1.2 km || 
|-id=180 bgcolor=#fefefe
| 366180 ||  || — || December 30, 2007 || Kitt Peak || Spacewatch || — || align=right | 1.0 km || 
|-id=181 bgcolor=#d6d6d6
| 366181 ||  || — || October 13, 2004 || Kitt Peak || Spacewatch || — || align=right | 4.1 km || 
|-id=182 bgcolor=#d6d6d6
| 366182 ||  || — || May 10, 2007 || Kitt Peak || Spacewatch || — || align=right | 4.1 km || 
|-id=183 bgcolor=#d6d6d6
| 366183 ||  || — || October 24, 2003 || Apache Point || SDSS || — || align=right | 3.5 km || 
|-id=184 bgcolor=#E9E9E9
| 366184 ||  || — || October 23, 2001 || Palomar || NEAT || — || align=right | 2.2 km || 
|-id=185 bgcolor=#d6d6d6
| 366185 ||  || — || April 15, 2002 || Palomar || NEAT || CHA || align=right | 3.0 km || 
|-id=186 bgcolor=#d6d6d6
| 366186 ||  || — || June 2, 2006 || Kitt Peak || Spacewatch || 7:4* || align=right | 5.1 km || 
|-id=187 bgcolor=#E9E9E9
| 366187 ||  || — || April 15, 2008 || Kitt Peak || Spacewatch || — || align=right data-sort-value="0.98" | 980 m || 
|-id=188 bgcolor=#d6d6d6
| 366188 ||  || — || January 30, 2011 || Kitt Peak || Spacewatch || EOS || align=right | 2.2 km || 
|-id=189 bgcolor=#d6d6d6
| 366189 ||  || — || April 18, 2001 || Kitt Peak || Spacewatch || VER || align=right | 3.6 km || 
|-id=190 bgcolor=#d6d6d6
| 366190 ||  || — || October 10, 2008 || Mount Lemmon || Mount Lemmon Survey || TIR || align=right | 4.0 km || 
|-id=191 bgcolor=#fefefe
| 366191 ||  || — || March 11, 2005 || Kitt Peak || Spacewatch || — || align=right data-sort-value="0.71" | 710 m || 
|-id=192 bgcolor=#d6d6d6
| 366192 ||  || — || October 7, 2004 || Socorro || LINEAR || — || align=right | 3.7 km || 
|-id=193 bgcolor=#d6d6d6
| 366193 ||  || — || July 7, 2002 || Kitt Peak || Spacewatch || THM || align=right | 2.6 km || 
|-id=194 bgcolor=#d6d6d6
| 366194 ||  || — || March 5, 2006 || Kitt Peak || Spacewatch || URS || align=right | 3.8 km || 
|-id=195 bgcolor=#E9E9E9
| 366195 ||  || — || October 24, 2005 || Kitt Peak || Spacewatch || — || align=right | 2.3 km || 
|-id=196 bgcolor=#d6d6d6
| 366196 ||  || — || September 20, 2003 || Kitt Peak || Spacewatch || URS || align=right | 5.0 km || 
|-id=197 bgcolor=#d6d6d6
| 366197 ||  || — || March 19, 2001 || Kitt Peak || Spacewatch || EOS || align=right | 2.1 km || 
|-id=198 bgcolor=#d6d6d6
| 366198 ||  || — || December 11, 2004 || Kitt Peak || Spacewatch || — || align=right | 3.4 km || 
|-id=199 bgcolor=#d6d6d6
| 366199 ||  || — || January 16, 2005 || Kitt Peak || Spacewatch || EUP || align=right | 5.3 km || 
|-id=200 bgcolor=#E9E9E9
| 366200 ||  || — || December 25, 2005 || Mount Lemmon || Mount Lemmon Survey || PAD || align=right | 2.1 km || 
|}

366201–366300 

|-bgcolor=#d6d6d6
| 366201 ||  || — || March 26, 2011 || Mount Lemmon || Mount Lemmon Survey || 7:4 || align=right | 5.0 km || 
|-id=202 bgcolor=#d6d6d6
| 366202 ||  || — || October 5, 2002 || Apache Point || SDSS || — || align=right | 2.9 km || 
|-id=203 bgcolor=#d6d6d6
| 366203 ||  || — || February 15, 2010 || Nogales || P. R. Holvorcem, M. Schwartz || ALA || align=right | 3.5 km || 
|-id=204 bgcolor=#E9E9E9
| 366204 ||  || — || December 4, 2005 || Kitt Peak || Spacewatch || — || align=right | 3.2 km || 
|-id=205 bgcolor=#E9E9E9
| 366205 ||  || — || September 23, 2008 || Catalina || CSS || EUN || align=right | 1.6 km || 
|-id=206 bgcolor=#d6d6d6
| 366206 ||  || — || December 7, 1996 || Kitt Peak || Spacewatch || EOS || align=right | 2.6 km || 
|-id=207 bgcolor=#fefefe
| 366207 ||  || — || September 6, 2008 || Catalina || CSS || — || align=right data-sort-value="0.97" | 970 m || 
|-id=208 bgcolor=#fefefe
| 366208 ||  || — || March 11, 2007 || Kitt Peak || Spacewatch || — || align=right | 1.0 km || 
|-id=209 bgcolor=#fefefe
| 366209 ||  || — || May 2, 2001 || Kitt Peak || Spacewatch || NYS || align=right data-sort-value="0.70" | 700 m || 
|-id=210 bgcolor=#d6d6d6
| 366210 ||  || — || October 13, 2007 || Mount Lemmon || Mount Lemmon Survey || — || align=right | 3.3 km || 
|-id=211 bgcolor=#E9E9E9
| 366211 ||  || — || February 2, 2006 || Mount Lemmon || Mount Lemmon Survey || — || align=right | 1.1 km || 
|-id=212 bgcolor=#d6d6d6
| 366212 ||  || — || January 19, 2004 || Kitt Peak || Spacewatch || — || align=right | 4.0 km || 
|-id=213 bgcolor=#fefefe
| 366213 ||  || — || November 18, 2001 || Socorro || LINEAR || — || align=right | 1.3 km || 
|-id=214 bgcolor=#fefefe
| 366214 ||  || — || March 21, 2001 || Kitt Peak || Spacewatch || FLO || align=right data-sort-value="0.77" | 770 m || 
|-id=215 bgcolor=#fefefe
| 366215 ||  || — || August 29, 2005 || Anderson Mesa || LONEOS || NYS || align=right data-sort-value="0.65" | 650 m || 
|-id=216 bgcolor=#E9E9E9
| 366216 ||  || — || September 25, 1998 || Kitt Peak || Spacewatch || — || align=right | 2.1 km || 
|-id=217 bgcolor=#E9E9E9
| 366217 ||  || — || November 30, 2003 || Kitt Peak || Spacewatch || AGN || align=right | 1.6 km || 
|-id=218 bgcolor=#E9E9E9
| 366218 ||  || — || October 17, 1995 || Kitt Peak || Spacewatch || — || align=right | 1.3 km || 
|-id=219 bgcolor=#d6d6d6
| 366219 ||  || — || September 25, 2006 || Kitt Peak || Spacewatch || HYG || align=right | 3.7 km || 
|-id=220 bgcolor=#fefefe
| 366220 ||  || — || October 3, 2005 || Catalina || CSS || — || align=right data-sort-value="0.82" | 820 m || 
|-id=221 bgcolor=#E9E9E9
| 366221 ||  || — || November 19, 1995 || Kitt Peak || Spacewatch || — || align=right | 2.3 km || 
|-id=222 bgcolor=#fefefe
| 366222 ||  || — || April 28, 2004 || Kitt Peak || Spacewatch || — || align=right | 1.2 km || 
|-id=223 bgcolor=#E9E9E9
| 366223 ||  || — || May 22, 2006 || Kitt Peak || Spacewatch || WIT || align=right | 1.3 km || 
|-id=224 bgcolor=#d6d6d6
| 366224 ||  || — || June 9, 1999 || Kitt Peak || Spacewatch || — || align=right | 3.3 km || 
|-id=225 bgcolor=#d6d6d6
| 366225 ||  || — || May 12, 2005 || Bergisch Gladbach || W. Bickel || — || align=right | 3.2 km || 
|-id=226 bgcolor=#d6d6d6
| 366226 ||  || — || November 1, 2007 || Kitt Peak || Spacewatch || — || align=right | 2.6 km || 
|-id=227 bgcolor=#d6d6d6
| 366227 ||  || — || September 19, 2001 || Socorro || LINEAR || MRC || align=right | 3.1 km || 
|-id=228 bgcolor=#fefefe
| 366228 ||  || — || November 28, 1999 || Kitt Peak || Spacewatch || — || align=right data-sort-value="0.75" | 750 m || 
|-id=229 bgcolor=#E9E9E9
| 366229 ||  || — || October 17, 2003 || Kitt Peak || Spacewatch || ADE || align=right | 2.6 km || 
|-id=230 bgcolor=#d6d6d6
| 366230 ||  || — || October 15, 2001 || Kitt Peak || Spacewatch || — || align=right | 2.8 km || 
|-id=231 bgcolor=#d6d6d6
| 366231 ||  || — || March 13, 2010 || Kitt Peak || Spacewatch || — || align=right | 4.1 km || 
|-id=232 bgcolor=#fefefe
| 366232 ||  || — || October 26, 2005 || Anderson Mesa || LONEOS || — || align=right data-sort-value="0.96" | 960 m || 
|-id=233 bgcolor=#fefefe
| 366233 ||  || — || August 30, 2005 || Kitt Peak || Spacewatch || — || align=right data-sort-value="0.94" | 940 m || 
|-id=234 bgcolor=#d6d6d6
| 366234 ||  || — || November 9, 2007 || Kitt Peak || Spacewatch || — || align=right | 2.9 km || 
|-id=235 bgcolor=#fefefe
| 366235 ||  || — || March 8, 2003 || Saint-Véran || D. Matter, C. Demeautis || — || align=right data-sort-value="0.98" | 980 m || 
|-id=236 bgcolor=#d6d6d6
| 366236 ||  || — || November 5, 2007 || Mount Lemmon || Mount Lemmon Survey || — || align=right | 2.6 km || 
|-id=237 bgcolor=#E9E9E9
| 366237 ||  || — || October 24, 1998 || Kitt Peak || Spacewatch || HOF || align=right | 3.0 km || 
|-id=238 bgcolor=#d6d6d6
| 366238 ||  || — || September 19, 2006 || Kitt Peak || Spacewatch || — || align=right | 2.7 km || 
|-id=239 bgcolor=#E9E9E9
| 366239 ||  || — || December 11, 2004 || Kitt Peak || Spacewatch || — || align=right | 1.5 km || 
|-id=240 bgcolor=#fefefe
| 366240 ||  || — || June 22, 2004 || Kitt Peak || Spacewatch || V || align=right data-sort-value="0.92" | 920 m || 
|-id=241 bgcolor=#E9E9E9
| 366241 ||  || — || October 20, 2003 || Kitt Peak || Spacewatch || HEN || align=right | 1.1 km || 
|-id=242 bgcolor=#fefefe
| 366242 ||  || — || September 30, 2002 || Socorro || LINEAR || — || align=right data-sort-value="0.78" | 780 m || 
|-id=243 bgcolor=#d6d6d6
| 366243 ||  || — || January 16, 2004 || Kitt Peak || Spacewatch || K-2 || align=right | 1.2 km || 
|-id=244 bgcolor=#d6d6d6
| 366244 ||  || — || April 1, 2003 || Apache Point || SDSS || TIR || align=right | 2.7 km || 
|-id=245 bgcolor=#fefefe
| 366245 ||  || — || November 7, 2008 || Mount Lemmon || Mount Lemmon Survey || — || align=right | 1.2 km || 
|-id=246 bgcolor=#d6d6d6
| 366246 ||  || — || October 19, 2006 || Catalina || CSS || — || align=right | 4.4 km || 
|-id=247 bgcolor=#fefefe
| 366247 ||  || — || May 24, 2011 || Mount Lemmon || Mount Lemmon Survey || H || align=right data-sort-value="0.90" | 900 m || 
|-id=248 bgcolor=#d6d6d6
| 366248 ||  || — || April 13, 2004 || Kitt Peak || Spacewatch || — || align=right | 3.6 km || 
|-id=249 bgcolor=#fefefe
| 366249 ||  || — || October 25, 2005 || Mount Lemmon || Mount Lemmon Survey || — || align=right data-sort-value="0.78" | 780 m || 
|-id=250 bgcolor=#d6d6d6
| 366250 ||  || — || September 16, 2006 || Anderson Mesa || LONEOS || — || align=right | 4.4 km || 
|-id=251 bgcolor=#d6d6d6
| 366251 ||  || — || September 28, 2001 || Palomar || NEAT || — || align=right | 3.8 km || 
|-id=252 bgcolor=#E9E9E9
| 366252 Evanmillsap ||  ||  || November 8, 2007 || Catalina || CSS || — || align=right | 2.9 km || 
|-id=253 bgcolor=#C2FFFF
| 366253 ||  || — || April 9, 2003 || Kitt Peak || Spacewatch || L4 || align=right | 10 km || 
|-id=254 bgcolor=#C2FFFF
| 366254 ||  || — || November 21, 1998 || Kitt Peak || Spacewatch || L4ERY || align=right | 8.1 km || 
|-id=255 bgcolor=#d6d6d6
| 366255 ||  || — || March 27, 2010 || WISE || WISE || — || align=right | 4.3 km || 
|-id=256 bgcolor=#d6d6d6
| 366256 ||  || — || May 13, 2009 || Kitt Peak || Spacewatch || — || align=right | 3.5 km || 
|-id=257 bgcolor=#E9E9E9
| 366257 ||  || — || January 15, 2005 || Catalina || CSS || — || align=right | 1.3 km || 
|-id=258 bgcolor=#fefefe
| 366258 ||  || — || January 7, 2005 || Catalina || CSS || H || align=right data-sort-value="0.86" | 860 m || 
|-id=259 bgcolor=#d6d6d6
| 366259 ||  || — || December 30, 2007 || Kitt Peak || Spacewatch || — || align=right | 2.9 km || 
|-id=260 bgcolor=#E9E9E9
| 366260 ||  || — || September 5, 2002 || Campo Imperatore || CINEOS || — || align=right | 2.1 km || 
|-id=261 bgcolor=#d6d6d6
| 366261 ||  || — || January 12, 2008 || Mount Lemmon || Mount Lemmon Survey || — || align=right | 4.7 km || 
|-id=262 bgcolor=#C2FFFF
| 366262 ||  || — || October 20, 2012 || Mount Lemmon || Mount Lemmon Survey || L4 || align=right | 12 km || 
|-id=263 bgcolor=#d6d6d6
| 366263 ||  || — || February 4, 2002 || Palomar || NEAT || — || align=right | 2.7 km || 
|-id=264 bgcolor=#C2FFFF
| 366264 ||  || — || October 2, 2009 || Mount Lemmon || Mount Lemmon Survey || L4 || align=right | 14 km || 
|-id=265 bgcolor=#fefefe
| 366265 ||  || — || January 6, 2002 || Palomar || NEAT || V || align=right | 1.1 km || 
|-id=266 bgcolor=#fefefe
| 366266 ||  || — || February 2, 2006 || Kitt Peak || Spacewatch || — || align=right | 1.0 km || 
|-id=267 bgcolor=#E9E9E9
| 366267 ||  || — || February 21, 2009 || Catalina || CSS || — || align=right | 1.7 km || 
|-id=268 bgcolor=#d6d6d6
| 366268 ||  || — || June 2, 2003 || Kitt Peak || Spacewatch || — || align=right | 4.5 km || 
|-id=269 bgcolor=#C2FFFF
| 366269 ||  || — || May 13, 2004 || Kitt Peak || Spacewatch || L4 || align=right | 8.7 km || 
|-id=270 bgcolor=#E9E9E9
| 366270 ||  || — || September 14, 2007 || Mount Lemmon || Mount Lemmon Survey || — || align=right | 1.5 km || 
|-id=271 bgcolor=#fefefe
| 366271 ||  || — || May 10, 1996 || Kitt Peak || Spacewatch || NYS || align=right data-sort-value="0.68" | 680 m || 
|-id=272 bgcolor=#d6d6d6
| 366272 Medellín ||  ||  || March 30, 2003 || Mérida || I. R. Ferrín, C. Leal || — || align=right | 6.4 km || 
|-id=273 bgcolor=#E9E9E9
| 366273 ||  || — || November 25, 2002 || Palomar || NEAT || — || align=right | 3.1 km || 
|-id=274 bgcolor=#fefefe
| 366274 ||  || — || October 4, 2004 || Kitt Peak || Spacewatch || — || align=right | 1.0 km || 
|-id=275 bgcolor=#fefefe
| 366275 ||  || — || February 26, 2003 || Bergisch Gladbac || W. Bickel || NYS || align=right data-sort-value="0.65" | 650 m || 
|-id=276 bgcolor=#E9E9E9
| 366276 ||  || — || October 23, 2003 || Apache Point || SDSS || ADE || align=right | 2.0 km || 
|-id=277 bgcolor=#fefefe
| 366277 ||  || — || January 24, 2006 || Anderson Mesa || LONEOS || — || align=right data-sort-value="0.93" | 930 m || 
|-id=278 bgcolor=#d6d6d6
| 366278 ||  || — || June 18, 2010 || Mount Lemmon || Mount Lemmon Survey || — || align=right | 4.7 km || 
|-id=279 bgcolor=#E9E9E9
| 366279 ||  || — || March 3, 2000 || Catalina || CSS || fast? || align=right | 1.9 km || 
|-id=280 bgcolor=#d6d6d6
| 366280 ||  || — || October 3, 2006 || Mount Lemmon || Mount Lemmon Survey || — || align=right | 2.8 km || 
|-id=281 bgcolor=#d6d6d6
| 366281 ||  || — || April 21, 2010 || WISE || WISE || VER || align=right | 4.0 km || 
|-id=282 bgcolor=#E9E9E9
| 366282 ||  || — || January 13, 2005 || Kitt Peak || Spacewatch || — || align=right | 1.2 km || 
|-id=283 bgcolor=#d6d6d6
| 366283 ||  || — || February 29, 2008 || Kitt Peak || Spacewatch || — || align=right | 4.2 km || 
|-id=284 bgcolor=#E9E9E9
| 366284 ||  || — || October 21, 2007 || Catalina || CSS || — || align=right | 2.8 km || 
|-id=285 bgcolor=#fefefe
| 366285 ||  || — || November 1, 2005 || Mount Lemmon || Mount Lemmon Survey || — || align=right data-sort-value="0.69" | 690 m || 
|-id=286 bgcolor=#d6d6d6
| 366286 ||  || — || September 13, 2005 || Kitt Peak || Spacewatch || — || align=right | 3.5 km || 
|-id=287 bgcolor=#C2FFFF
| 366287 ||  || — || September 6, 2008 || Kitt Peak || Spacewatch || L4 || align=right | 9.8 km || 
|-id=288 bgcolor=#E9E9E9
| 366288 ||  || — || November 18, 2003 || Kitt Peak || Spacewatch || — || align=right | 1.5 km || 
|-id=289 bgcolor=#d6d6d6
| 366289 ||  || — || December 23, 2001 || Kitt Peak || Spacewatch || — || align=right | 3.6 km || 
|-id=290 bgcolor=#d6d6d6
| 366290 ||  || — || August 28, 2006 || Kitt Peak || Spacewatch || — || align=right | 2.5 km || 
|-id=291 bgcolor=#E9E9E9
| 366291 ||  || — || December 22, 2003 || Kitt Peak || Spacewatch || — || align=right | 1.9 km || 
|-id=292 bgcolor=#fefefe
| 366292 ||  || — || February 7, 2002 || Socorro || LINEAR || NYS || align=right data-sort-value="0.82" | 820 m || 
|-id=293 bgcolor=#d6d6d6
| 366293 ||  || — || September 29, 2005 || Kitt Peak || Spacewatch || — || align=right | 3.9 km || 
|-id=294 bgcolor=#fefefe
| 366294 ||  || — || January 22, 2002 || Kitt Peak || Spacewatch || — || align=right data-sort-value="0.87" | 870 m || 
|-id=295 bgcolor=#fefefe
| 366295 ||  || — || April 19, 2006 || Mount Lemmon || Mount Lemmon Survey || MAS || align=right data-sort-value="0.75" | 750 m || 
|-id=296 bgcolor=#E9E9E9
| 366296 ||  || — || March 11, 2005 || Kitt Peak || Spacewatch || — || align=right | 1.6 km || 
|-id=297 bgcolor=#d6d6d6
| 366297 ||  || — || August 31, 2005 || Kitt Peak || Spacewatch || — || align=right | 4.2 km || 
|-id=298 bgcolor=#fefefe
| 366298 ||  || — || September 23, 2000 || Socorro || LINEAR || — || align=right data-sort-value="0.97" | 970 m || 
|-id=299 bgcolor=#fefefe
| 366299 ||  || — || March 3, 2006 || Catalina || CSS || — || align=right | 1.1 km || 
|-id=300 bgcolor=#d6d6d6
| 366300 ||  || — || February 3, 2008 || Kitt Peak || Spacewatch || — || align=right | 3.4 km || 
|}

366301–366400 

|-bgcolor=#d6d6d6
| 366301 ||  || — || June 6, 2010 || WISE || WISE || — || align=right | 4.4 km || 
|-id=302 bgcolor=#fefefe
| 366302 ||  || — || December 31, 2008 || Mount Lemmon || Mount Lemmon Survey || — || align=right | 1.2 km || 
|-id=303 bgcolor=#E9E9E9
| 366303 ||  || — || November 15, 2007 || Mount Lemmon || Mount Lemmon Survey || — || align=right | 2.8 km || 
|-id=304 bgcolor=#d6d6d6
| 366304 ||  || — || May 3, 2008 || Kitt Peak || Spacewatch || — || align=right | 3.3 km || 
|-id=305 bgcolor=#d6d6d6
| 366305 ||  || — || October 1, 2005 || Catalina || CSS || EOS || align=right | 2.3 km || 
|-id=306 bgcolor=#fefefe
| 366306 ||  || — || July 24, 2003 || Palomar || NEAT || — || align=right | 1.00 km || 
|-id=307 bgcolor=#d6d6d6
| 366307 ||  || — || March 3, 2006 || Mount Lemmon || Mount Lemmon Survey || 7:4 || align=right | 4.0 km || 
|-id=308 bgcolor=#d6d6d6
| 366308 ||  || — || January 8, 2002 || Kitt Peak || Spacewatch || EOS || align=right | 2.3 km || 
|-id=309 bgcolor=#fefefe
| 366309 ||  || — || November 30, 2008 || Kitt Peak || Spacewatch || — || align=right | 1.1 km || 
|-id=310 bgcolor=#d6d6d6
| 366310 ||  || — || March 11, 2002 || Palomar || NEAT || Tj (2.97) || align=right | 3.5 km || 
|-id=311 bgcolor=#fefefe
| 366311 ||  || — || March 24, 2003 || Kitt Peak || Spacewatch || — || align=right data-sort-value="0.54" | 540 m || 
|-id=312 bgcolor=#E9E9E9
| 366312 ||  || — || February 10, 2004 || Palomar || NEAT || — || align=right | 2.5 km || 
|-id=313 bgcolor=#E9E9E9
| 366313 ||  || — || October 3, 2002 || Palomar || NEAT || — || align=right | 2.0 km || 
|-id=314 bgcolor=#E9E9E9
| 366314 ||  || — || February 16, 2004 || Kitt Peak || Spacewatch || — || align=right | 3.3 km || 
|-id=315 bgcolor=#E9E9E9
| 366315 ||  || — || January 30, 2009 || Mount Lemmon || Mount Lemmon Survey || — || align=right | 2.2 km || 
|-id=316 bgcolor=#E9E9E9
| 366316 ||  || — || May 12, 1996 || Kitt Peak || Spacewatch || — || align=right | 1.9 km || 
|-id=317 bgcolor=#C2FFFF
| 366317 ||  || — || September 4, 2008 || Kitt Peak || Spacewatch || L4ERY || align=right | 6.8 km || 
|-id=318 bgcolor=#fefefe
| 366318 ||  || — || October 5, 2007 || Kitt Peak || Spacewatch || — || align=right data-sort-value="0.92" | 920 m || 
|-id=319 bgcolor=#d6d6d6
| 366319 ||  || — || February 26, 2008 || Mount Lemmon || Mount Lemmon Survey || KOR || align=right | 1.8 km || 
|-id=320 bgcolor=#d6d6d6
| 366320 ||  || — || February 8, 2002 || Kitt Peak || M. W. Buie || — || align=right | 3.2 km || 
|-id=321 bgcolor=#fefefe
| 366321 ||  || — || January 27, 2003 || Socorro || LINEAR || — || align=right data-sort-value="0.75" | 750 m || 
|-id=322 bgcolor=#E9E9E9
| 366322 ||  || — || February 28, 2009 || Kitt Peak || Spacewatch || — || align=right | 1.1 km || 
|-id=323 bgcolor=#fefefe
| 366323 ||  || — || October 14, 2004 || Kitt Peak || Spacewatch || NYS || align=right data-sort-value="0.69" | 690 m || 
|-id=324 bgcolor=#E9E9E9
| 366324 ||  || — || April 20, 2009 || Mount Lemmon || Mount Lemmon Survey || — || align=right | 1.6 km || 
|-id=325 bgcolor=#E9E9E9
| 366325 ||  || — || February 12, 2004 || Kitt Peak || Spacewatch || — || align=right | 1.8 km || 
|-id=326 bgcolor=#E9E9E9
| 366326 ||  || — || April 27, 2000 || Anderson Mesa || LONEOS || slow || align=right | 3.6 km || 
|-id=327 bgcolor=#d6d6d6
| 366327 ||  || — || April 2, 2006 || Kitt Peak || Spacewatch || 3:2 || align=right | 4.7 km || 
|-id=328 bgcolor=#d6d6d6
| 366328 ||  || — || January 17, 2007 || Kitt Peak || Spacewatch || VER || align=right | 3.2 km || 
|-id=329 bgcolor=#E9E9E9
| 366329 ||  || — || January 16, 2004 || Kitt Peak || Spacewatch || — || align=right | 1.5 km || 
|-id=330 bgcolor=#E9E9E9
| 366330 ||  || — || January 29, 2004 || Socorro || LINEAR || — || align=right | 2.0 km || 
|-id=331 bgcolor=#E9E9E9
| 366331 ||  || — || October 18, 2001 || Kitt Peak || Spacewatch || AGN || align=right | 1.3 km || 
|-id=332 bgcolor=#E9E9E9
| 366332 ||  || — || May 10, 2005 || Kitt Peak || Spacewatch || — || align=right | 1.2 km || 
|-id=333 bgcolor=#d6d6d6
| 366333 ||  || — || October 19, 2003 || Apache Point || SDSS || — || align=right | 2.8 km || 
|-id=334 bgcolor=#fefefe
| 366334 ||  || — || October 19, 2001 || Palomar || NEAT || NYS || align=right data-sort-value="0.54" | 540 m || 
|-id=335 bgcolor=#E9E9E9
| 366335 ||  || — || March 10, 2000 || Socorro || LINEAR || — || align=right | 1.8 km || 
|-id=336 bgcolor=#fefefe
| 366336 ||  || — || September 28, 1998 || Kitt Peak || Spacewatch || — || align=right data-sort-value="0.57" | 570 m || 
|-id=337 bgcolor=#E9E9E9
| 366337 ||  || — || August 28, 2006 || Kitt Peak || Spacewatch || — || align=right | 1.7 km || 
|-id=338 bgcolor=#fefefe
| 366338 ||  || — || January 7, 2005 || Catalina || CSS || — || align=right | 1.1 km || 
|-id=339 bgcolor=#d6d6d6
| 366339 ||  || — || January 21, 2002 || Kitt Peak || Spacewatch || — || align=right | 3.7 km || 
|-id=340 bgcolor=#fefefe
| 366340 ||  || — || March 28, 2003 || Kitt Peak || Spacewatch || — || align=right data-sort-value="0.97" | 970 m || 
|-id=341 bgcolor=#fefefe
| 366341 || 4082 T-2 || — || September 29, 1973 || Palomar || PLS || MAS || align=right data-sort-value="0.85" | 850 m || 
|-id=342 bgcolor=#d6d6d6
| 366342 ||  || — || October 9, 1993 || La Silla || E. W. Elst || — || align=right | 2.6 km || 
|-id=343 bgcolor=#FA8072
| 366343 ||  || — || June 15, 1994 || Siding Spring || G. J. Garradd || unusual || align=right | 2.7 km || 
|-id=344 bgcolor=#fefefe
| 366344 ||  || — || October 12, 1996 || Kitt Peak || Spacewatch || — || align=right data-sort-value="0.58" | 580 m || 
|-id=345 bgcolor=#d6d6d6
| 366345 ||  || — || September 28, 1997 || Kitt Peak || Spacewatch || — || align=right | 2.8 km || 
|-id=346 bgcolor=#fefefe
| 366346 ||  || — || September 30, 1997 || Kitt Peak || Spacewatch || — || align=right data-sort-value="0.65" | 650 m || 
|-id=347 bgcolor=#d6d6d6
| 366347 ||  || — || June 30, 1998 || Kitt Peak || Spacewatch || SAN || align=right | 1.8 km || 
|-id=348 bgcolor=#fefefe
| 366348 ||  || — || October 17, 1998 || Kitt Peak || Spacewatch || MAS || align=right | 1.0 km || 
|-id=349 bgcolor=#fefefe
| 366349 ||  || — || September 5, 1999 || Ondřejov || L. Kotková || — || align=right data-sort-value="0.75" | 750 m || 
|-id=350 bgcolor=#fefefe
| 366350 ||  || — || September 9, 1999 || Socorro || LINEAR || — || align=right | 1.1 km || 
|-id=351 bgcolor=#FA8072
| 366351 ||  || — || October 8, 1999 || Kleť || Kleť Obs. || — || align=right data-sort-value="0.72" | 720 m || 
|-id=352 bgcolor=#fefefe
| 366352 ||  || — || October 4, 1999 || Socorro || LINEAR || — || align=right data-sort-value="0.99" | 990 m || 
|-id=353 bgcolor=#d6d6d6
| 366353 ||  || — || October 10, 1999 || Kitt Peak || Spacewatch || — || align=right | 3.2 km || 
|-id=354 bgcolor=#d6d6d6
| 366354 ||  || — || October 10, 1999 || Socorro || LINEAR || TRP || align=right | 3.3 km || 
|-id=355 bgcolor=#d6d6d6
| 366355 ||  || — || October 29, 1999 || Catalina || CSS || — || align=right | 1.8 km || 
|-id=356 bgcolor=#d6d6d6
| 366356 ||  || — || October 31, 1999 || Catalina || CSS || — || align=right | 2.7 km || 
|-id=357 bgcolor=#fefefe
| 366357 ||  || — || November 3, 1999 || Kitt Peak || Spacewatch || MAS || align=right data-sort-value="0.69" | 690 m || 
|-id=358 bgcolor=#fefefe
| 366358 ||  || — || November 29, 1999 || Kitt Peak || Spacewatch || NYS || align=right data-sort-value="0.54" | 540 m || 
|-id=359 bgcolor=#fefefe
| 366359 ||  || — || January 5, 2000 || Socorro || LINEAR || — || align=right data-sort-value="0.98" | 980 m || 
|-id=360 bgcolor=#d6d6d6
| 366360 ||  || — || January 8, 2000 || Kitt Peak || Spacewatch || EUP || align=right | 4.2 km || 
|-id=361 bgcolor=#d6d6d6
| 366361 ||  || — || January 29, 2000 || Kitt Peak || Spacewatch || — || align=right | 3.9 km || 
|-id=362 bgcolor=#d6d6d6
| 366362 ||  || — || February 2, 2000 || Socorro || LINEAR || THB || align=right | 4.0 km || 
|-id=363 bgcolor=#E9E9E9
| 366363 ||  || — || March 3, 2000 || Kitt Peak || Spacewatch || — || align=right data-sort-value="0.82" | 820 m || 
|-id=364 bgcolor=#E9E9E9
| 366364 ||  || — || March 5, 2000 || Socorro || LINEAR || — || align=right | 1.1 km || 
|-id=365 bgcolor=#d6d6d6
| 366365 ||  || — || May 27, 2000 || Socorro || LINEAR || EUP || align=right | 6.2 km || 
|-id=366 bgcolor=#FA8072
| 366366 ||  || — || August 9, 2000 || Socorro || LINEAR || — || align=right | 1.6 km || 
|-id=367 bgcolor=#E9E9E9
| 366367 ||  || — || August 25, 2000 || Socorro || LINEAR || — || align=right | 1.5 km || 
|-id=368 bgcolor=#fefefe
| 366368 ||  || — || September 1, 2000 || Socorro || LINEAR || — || align=right data-sort-value="0.85" | 850 m || 
|-id=369 bgcolor=#fefefe
| 366369 ||  || — || September 7, 2000 || Kitt Peak || Spacewatch || FLO || align=right data-sort-value="0.72" | 720 m || 
|-id=370 bgcolor=#E9E9E9
| 366370 ||  || — || September 5, 2000 || Anderson Mesa || LONEOS || 526 || align=right | 3.2 km || 
|-id=371 bgcolor=#E9E9E9
| 366371 ||  || — || September 23, 2000 || Socorro || LINEAR || — || align=right | 2.5 km || 
|-id=372 bgcolor=#E9E9E9
| 366372 ||  || — || September 22, 2000 || Socorro || LINEAR || JUN || align=right | 1.5 km || 
|-id=373 bgcolor=#E9E9E9
| 366373 ||  || — || September 23, 2000 || Socorro || LINEAR || MAR || align=right | 1.5 km || 
|-id=374 bgcolor=#fefefe
| 366374 ||  || — || September 25, 2000 || Socorro || LINEAR || — || align=right data-sort-value="0.90" | 900 m || 
|-id=375 bgcolor=#E9E9E9
| 366375 ||  || — || September 23, 2000 || Socorro || LINEAR || — || align=right | 2.9 km || 
|-id=376 bgcolor=#E9E9E9
| 366376 ||  || — || September 24, 2000 || Socorro || LINEAR || — || align=right | 3.0 km || 
|-id=377 bgcolor=#fefefe
| 366377 ||  || — || September 28, 2000 || Socorro || LINEAR || H || align=right data-sort-value="0.78" | 780 m || 
|-id=378 bgcolor=#fefefe
| 366378 ||  || — || September 28, 2000 || Socorro || LINEAR || — || align=right data-sort-value="0.94" | 940 m || 
|-id=379 bgcolor=#E9E9E9
| 366379 ||  || — || September 28, 2000 || Socorro || LINEAR || JUN || align=right | 1.6 km || 
|-id=380 bgcolor=#E9E9E9
| 366380 ||  || — || October 1, 2000 || Socorro || LINEAR || — || align=right | 2.4 km || 
|-id=381 bgcolor=#E9E9E9
| 366381 ||  || — || October 2, 2000 || Socorro || LINEAR || — || align=right | 2.8 km || 
|-id=382 bgcolor=#E9E9E9
| 366382 ||  || — || October 25, 2000 || Socorro || LINEAR || EUN || align=right | 2.1 km || 
|-id=383 bgcolor=#E9E9E9
| 366383 ||  || — || November 21, 2000 || Socorro || LINEAR || EUN || align=right | 1.8 km || 
|-id=384 bgcolor=#fefefe
| 366384 ||  || — || November 19, 2000 || Socorro || LINEAR || — || align=right | 2.0 km || 
|-id=385 bgcolor=#E9E9E9
| 366385 ||  || — || November 27, 2000 || Socorro || LINEAR || MRX || align=right | 1.1 km || 
|-id=386 bgcolor=#E9E9E9
| 366386 ||  || — || December 26, 2000 || Haleakala || NEAT || — || align=right | 3.5 km || 
|-id=387 bgcolor=#FA8072
| 366387 ||  || — || February 3, 2001 || Socorro || LINEAR || Tj (2.87) || align=right | 3.9 km || 
|-id=388 bgcolor=#E9E9E9
| 366388 ||  || — || July 23, 2001 || Palomar || NEAT || — || align=right | 1.2 km || 
|-id=389 bgcolor=#E9E9E9
| 366389 ||  || — || August 5, 2001 || Palomar || NEAT || MAR || align=right | 1.7 km || 
|-id=390 bgcolor=#E9E9E9
| 366390 ||  || — || August 17, 2001 || Palomar || NEAT || — || align=right | 1.3 km || 
|-id=391 bgcolor=#E9E9E9
| 366391 ||  || — || August 16, 2001 || Socorro || LINEAR || MAR || align=right | 1.3 km || 
|-id=392 bgcolor=#E9E9E9
| 366392 ||  || — || August 25, 2001 || Socorro || LINEAR || — || align=right | 1.3 km || 
|-id=393 bgcolor=#E9E9E9
| 366393 ||  || — || August 17, 2001 || Palomar || NEAT || — || align=right data-sort-value="0.98" | 980 m || 
|-id=394 bgcolor=#E9E9E9
| 366394 ||  || — || August 22, 2001 || Haleakala || NEAT || — || align=right | 1.1 km || 
|-id=395 bgcolor=#E9E9E9
| 366395 ||  || — || August 22, 2001 || Socorro || LINEAR || — || align=right | 1.5 km || 
|-id=396 bgcolor=#E9E9E9
| 366396 ||  || — || August 23, 2001 || Anderson Mesa || LONEOS || — || align=right data-sort-value="0.75" | 750 m || 
|-id=397 bgcolor=#E9E9E9
| 366397 ||  || — || August 24, 2001 || Socorro || LINEAR || — || align=right data-sort-value="0.95" | 950 m || 
|-id=398 bgcolor=#E9E9E9
| 366398 ||  || — || September 7, 2001 || Socorro || LINEAR || — || align=right | 1.0 km || 
|-id=399 bgcolor=#E9E9E9
| 366399 ||  || — || September 11, 2001 || Socorro || LINEAR || — || align=right data-sort-value="0.98" | 980 m || 
|-id=400 bgcolor=#E9E9E9
| 366400 ||  || — || September 12, 2001 || Kitt Peak || Spacewatch || — || align=right data-sort-value="0.82" | 820 m || 
|}

366401–366500 

|-bgcolor=#E9E9E9
| 366401 ||  || — || September 12, 2001 || Socorro || LINEAR || — || align=right | 1.0 km || 
|-id=402 bgcolor=#E9E9E9
| 366402 ||  || — || September 20, 2001 || Socorro || LINEAR || RAF || align=right | 1.2 km || 
|-id=403 bgcolor=#E9E9E9
| 366403 ||  || — || September 20, 2001 || Socorro || LINEAR || — || align=right data-sort-value="0.75" | 750 m || 
|-id=404 bgcolor=#E9E9E9
| 366404 ||  || — || September 16, 2001 || Socorro || LINEAR || — || align=right data-sort-value="0.89" | 890 m || 
|-id=405 bgcolor=#E9E9E9
| 366405 ||  || — || September 16, 2001 || Socorro || LINEAR || — || align=right | 1.1 km || 
|-id=406 bgcolor=#E9E9E9
| 366406 ||  || — || September 21, 2001 || Anderson Mesa || LONEOS || — || align=right | 1.7 km || 
|-id=407 bgcolor=#E9E9E9
| 366407 ||  || — || September 10, 2001 || Anderson Mesa || LONEOS || ADE || align=right | 2.0 km || 
|-id=408 bgcolor=#E9E9E9
| 366408 ||  || — || September 21, 2001 || Socorro || LINEAR || — || align=right | 1.1 km || 
|-id=409 bgcolor=#E9E9E9
| 366409 ||  || — || September 21, 2001 || Palomar || NEAT || — || align=right | 1.5 km || 
|-id=410 bgcolor=#E9E9E9
| 366410 ||  || — || September 21, 2001 || Palomar || NEAT || — || align=right | 1.0 km || 
|-id=411 bgcolor=#E9E9E9
| 366411 ||  || — || October 10, 2001 || Kitt Peak || Spacewatch || — || align=right | 1.2 km || 
|-id=412 bgcolor=#E9E9E9
| 366412 ||  || — || October 10, 2001 || Palomar || NEAT || — || align=right data-sort-value="0.95" | 950 m || 
|-id=413 bgcolor=#E9E9E9
| 366413 ||  || — || October 14, 2001 || Socorro || LINEAR || — || align=right data-sort-value="0.80" | 800 m || 
|-id=414 bgcolor=#E9E9E9
| 366414 ||  || — || October 7, 2001 || Palomar || NEAT || — || align=right | 1.8 km || 
|-id=415 bgcolor=#FA8072
| 366415 ||  || — || October 14, 2001 || Socorro || LINEAR || — || align=right data-sort-value="0.97" | 970 m || 
|-id=416 bgcolor=#E9E9E9
| 366416 ||  || — || October 13, 2001 || Kitt Peak || Spacewatch || — || align=right | 1.2 km || 
|-id=417 bgcolor=#E9E9E9
| 366417 ||  || — || October 14, 2001 || Socorro || LINEAR || critical || align=right data-sort-value="0.52" | 520 m || 
|-id=418 bgcolor=#E9E9E9
| 366418 ||  || — || October 10, 2001 || Palomar || NEAT || — || align=right | 1.2 km || 
|-id=419 bgcolor=#E9E9E9
| 366419 ||  || — || October 15, 2001 || Socorro || LINEAR || — || align=right data-sort-value="0.97" | 970 m || 
|-id=420 bgcolor=#E9E9E9
| 366420 ||  || — || October 17, 2001 || Socorro || LINEAR || — || align=right | 1.3 km || 
|-id=421 bgcolor=#E9E9E9
| 366421 ||  || — || October 17, 2001 || Socorro || LINEAR || — || align=right | 2.3 km || 
|-id=422 bgcolor=#E9E9E9
| 366422 ||  || — || October 17, 2001 || Socorro || LINEAR || — || align=right | 1.3 km || 
|-id=423 bgcolor=#E9E9E9
| 366423 ||  || — || October 23, 2001 || Palomar || NEAT || — || align=right | 1.0 km || 
|-id=424 bgcolor=#E9E9E9
| 366424 ||  || — || October 24, 2001 || Socorro || LINEAR || — || align=right | 1.6 km || 
|-id=425 bgcolor=#E9E9E9
| 366425 ||  || — || November 9, 2001 || Socorro || LINEAR || — || align=right | 1.4 km || 
|-id=426 bgcolor=#E9E9E9
| 366426 ||  || — || November 9, 2001 || Socorro || LINEAR || — || align=right | 1.2 km || 
|-id=427 bgcolor=#E9E9E9
| 366427 ||  || — || November 9, 2001 || Socorro || LINEAR || EUN || align=right | 1.5 km || 
|-id=428 bgcolor=#E9E9E9
| 366428 ||  || — || November 9, 2001 || Socorro || LINEAR || — || align=right | 3.7 km || 
|-id=429 bgcolor=#fefefe
| 366429 ||  || — || November 11, 2001 || Socorro || LINEAR || H || align=right data-sort-value="0.68" | 680 m || 
|-id=430 bgcolor=#FA8072
| 366430 ||  || — || November 12, 2001 || Socorro || LINEAR || — || align=right | 1.2 km || 
|-id=431 bgcolor=#FA8072
| 366431 ||  || — || November 15, 2001 || Socorro || LINEAR || — || align=right | 2.7 km || 
|-id=432 bgcolor=#FA8072
| 366432 ||  || — || November 17, 2001 || Socorro || LINEAR || H || align=right data-sort-value="0.68" | 680 m || 
|-id=433 bgcolor=#E9E9E9
| 366433 ||  || — || November 17, 2001 || Socorro || LINEAR || — || align=right data-sort-value="0.86" | 860 m || 
|-id=434 bgcolor=#E9E9E9
| 366434 ||  || — || November 18, 2001 || Kitt Peak || Spacewatch || — || align=right | 1.1 km || 
|-id=435 bgcolor=#E9E9E9
| 366435 ||  || — || November 19, 2001 || Socorro || LINEAR || — || align=right | 1.5 km || 
|-id=436 bgcolor=#E9E9E9
| 366436 ||  || — || November 21, 2001 || Socorro || LINEAR || — || align=right | 1.3 km || 
|-id=437 bgcolor=#E9E9E9
| 366437 ||  || — || November 18, 2001 || Socorro || LINEAR || — || align=right | 1.5 km || 
|-id=438 bgcolor=#E9E9E9
| 366438 ||  || — || December 9, 2001 || Socorro || LINEAR || JUN || align=right | 1.4 km || 
|-id=439 bgcolor=#E9E9E9
| 366439 ||  || — || December 9, 2001 || Socorro || LINEAR || — || align=right | 1.5 km || 
|-id=440 bgcolor=#E9E9E9
| 366440 ||  || — || December 10, 2001 || Socorro || LINEAR || GER || align=right | 2.3 km || 
|-id=441 bgcolor=#E9E9E9
| 366441 ||  || — || December 14, 2001 || Socorro || LINEAR || EUN || align=right | 1.7 km || 
|-id=442 bgcolor=#E9E9E9
| 366442 ||  || — || December 14, 2001 || Socorro || LINEAR || — || align=right | 1.7 km || 
|-id=443 bgcolor=#E9E9E9
| 366443 ||  || — || December 14, 2001 || Socorro || LINEAR || — || align=right | 2.7 km || 
|-id=444 bgcolor=#E9E9E9
| 366444 ||  || — || December 11, 2001 || Socorro || LINEAR || — || align=right | 2.3 km || 
|-id=445 bgcolor=#E9E9E9
| 366445 ||  || — || December 14, 2001 || Socorro || LINEAR || — || align=right | 2.1 km || 
|-id=446 bgcolor=#E9E9E9
| 366446 ||  || — || December 17, 2001 || Socorro || LINEAR || — || align=right | 3.1 km || 
|-id=447 bgcolor=#E9E9E9
| 366447 ||  || — || December 18, 2001 || Socorro || LINEAR || — || align=right | 2.9 km || 
|-id=448 bgcolor=#E9E9E9
| 366448 ||  || — || December 21, 2001 || Socorro || LINEAR || — || align=right | 1.6 km || 
|-id=449 bgcolor=#E9E9E9
| 366449 ||  || — || December 19, 2001 || Palomar || NEAT || — || align=right | 3.7 km || 
|-id=450 bgcolor=#FA8072
| 366450 ||  || — || January 9, 2002 || Socorro || LINEAR || — || align=right | 2.9 km || 
|-id=451 bgcolor=#FA8072
| 366451 ||  || — || January 11, 2002 || Socorro || LINEAR || — || align=right | 1.4 km || 
|-id=452 bgcolor=#E9E9E9
| 366452 ||  || — || January 12, 2002 || Socorro || LINEAR || — || align=right | 1.6 km || 
|-id=453 bgcolor=#E9E9E9
| 366453 ||  || — || January 8, 2002 || Socorro || LINEAR || — || align=right | 1.8 km || 
|-id=454 bgcolor=#E9E9E9
| 366454 ||  || — || January 9, 2002 || Socorro || LINEAR || — || align=right | 1.9 km || 
|-id=455 bgcolor=#FA8072
| 366455 ||  || — || January 13, 2002 || Socorro || LINEAR || — || align=right | 2.0 km || 
|-id=456 bgcolor=#E9E9E9
| 366456 ||  || — || January 14, 2002 || Socorro || LINEAR || — || align=right | 3.0 km || 
|-id=457 bgcolor=#fefefe
| 366457 ||  || — || January 14, 2002 || Socorro || LINEAR || — || align=right data-sort-value="0.92" | 920 m || 
|-id=458 bgcolor=#fefefe
| 366458 ||  || — || February 3, 2002 || Haleakala || NEAT || H || align=right data-sort-value="0.58" | 580 m || 
|-id=459 bgcolor=#fefefe
| 366459 ||  || — || February 6, 2002 || Palomar || NEAT || H || align=right data-sort-value="0.87" | 870 m || 
|-id=460 bgcolor=#E9E9E9
| 366460 ||  || — || February 6, 2002 || Socorro || LINEAR || — || align=right | 2.4 km || 
|-id=461 bgcolor=#fefefe
| 366461 ||  || — || February 6, 2002 || Socorro || LINEAR || FLO || align=right data-sort-value="0.73" | 730 m || 
|-id=462 bgcolor=#E9E9E9
| 366462 ||  || — || February 8, 2002 || Kitt Peak || Spacewatch || — || align=right | 1.3 km || 
|-id=463 bgcolor=#E9E9E9
| 366463 ||  || — || February 7, 2002 || Socorro || LINEAR || — || align=right data-sort-value="0.87" | 870 m || 
|-id=464 bgcolor=#E9E9E9
| 366464 ||  || — || January 13, 2002 || Socorro || LINEAR || HNS || align=right | 1.5 km || 
|-id=465 bgcolor=#fefefe
| 366465 ||  || — || March 11, 2002 || Palomar || NEAT || H || align=right data-sort-value="0.64" | 640 m || 
|-id=466 bgcolor=#FA8072
| 366466 ||  || — || March 9, 2002 || Socorro || LINEAR || H || align=right data-sort-value="0.65" | 650 m || 
|-id=467 bgcolor=#fefefe
| 366467 ||  || — || March 12, 2002 || Kitt Peak || Spacewatch || — || align=right data-sort-value="0.80" | 800 m || 
|-id=468 bgcolor=#fefefe
| 366468 ||  || — || March 13, 2002 || Socorro || LINEAR || — || align=right data-sort-value="0.89" | 890 m || 
|-id=469 bgcolor=#d6d6d6
| 366469 ||  || — || March 12, 2002 || Palomar || NEAT || — || align=right | 3.7 km || 
|-id=470 bgcolor=#FFC2E0
| 366470 ||  || — || March 16, 2002 || Socorro || LINEAR || AMO || align=right data-sort-value="0.45" | 450 m || 
|-id=471 bgcolor=#fefefe
| 366471 ||  || — || March 16, 2002 || Haleakala || NEAT || FLO || align=right data-sort-value="0.66" | 660 m || 
|-id=472 bgcolor=#d6d6d6
| 366472 ||  || — || April 8, 2002 || Kitt Peak || Spacewatch || — || align=right | 2.1 km || 
|-id=473 bgcolor=#fefefe
| 366473 ||  || — || April 9, 2002 || Socorro || LINEAR || — || align=right | 1.3 km || 
|-id=474 bgcolor=#fefefe
| 366474 ||  || — || April 11, 2002 || Socorro || LINEAR || — || align=right data-sort-value="0.88" | 880 m || 
|-id=475 bgcolor=#E9E9E9
| 366475 ||  || — || April 12, 2002 || Socorro || LINEAR || — || align=right | 2.9 km || 
|-id=476 bgcolor=#d6d6d6
| 366476 ||  || — || March 12, 2007 || Kitt Peak || Spacewatch || — || align=right | 2.5 km || 
|-id=477 bgcolor=#d6d6d6
| 366477 ||  || — || April 9, 2002 || Palomar || NEAT || — || align=right | 2.3 km || 
|-id=478 bgcolor=#fefefe
| 366478 ||  || — || April 5, 2002 || Palomar || NEAT || — || align=right data-sort-value="0.86" | 860 m || 
|-id=479 bgcolor=#fefefe
| 366479 ||  || — || May 9, 2002 || Socorro || LINEAR || — || align=right data-sort-value="0.85" | 850 m || 
|-id=480 bgcolor=#fefefe
| 366480 ||  || — || May 9, 2002 || Socorro || LINEAR || — || align=right data-sort-value="0.77" | 770 m || 
|-id=481 bgcolor=#fefefe
| 366481 ||  || — || May 11, 2002 || Socorro || LINEAR || V || align=right data-sort-value="0.89" | 890 m || 
|-id=482 bgcolor=#d6d6d6
| 366482 ||  || — || May 4, 2002 || Palomar || NEAT || EOS || align=right | 2.0 km || 
|-id=483 bgcolor=#d6d6d6
| 366483 ||  || — || May 17, 2002 || Socorro || LINEAR || TIR || align=right | 3.6 km || 
|-id=484 bgcolor=#d6d6d6
| 366484 ||  || — || September 23, 2008 || Catalina || CSS || TIR || align=right | 2.7 km || 
|-id=485 bgcolor=#d6d6d6
| 366485 ||  || — || July 13, 2002 || Socorro || LINEAR || EUP || align=right | 6.5 km || 
|-id=486 bgcolor=#d6d6d6
| 366486 ||  || — || July 13, 2002 || Socorro || LINEAR || TIR || align=right | 4.5 km || 
|-id=487 bgcolor=#fefefe
| 366487 ||  || — || July 4, 2002 || Palomar || M. Meyer || — || align=right data-sort-value="0.85" | 850 m || 
|-id=488 bgcolor=#fefefe
| 366488 ||  || — || July 9, 2002 || Palomar || NEAT || NYS || align=right data-sort-value="0.48" | 480 m || 
|-id=489 bgcolor=#d6d6d6
| 366489 ||  || — || July 9, 2002 || Palomar || NEAT || EOS || align=right | 2.1 km || 
|-id=490 bgcolor=#d6d6d6
| 366490 ||  || — || July 8, 2002 || Palomar || NEAT || THM || align=right | 2.4 km || 
|-id=491 bgcolor=#fefefe
| 366491 ||  || — || July 14, 2002 || Palomar || NEAT || — || align=right data-sort-value="0.76" | 760 m || 
|-id=492 bgcolor=#fefefe
| 366492 ||  || — || July 14, 2002 || Palomar || NEAT || ERI || align=right | 1.8 km || 
|-id=493 bgcolor=#fefefe
| 366493 ||  || — || April 27, 2009 || Mount Lemmon || Mount Lemmon Survey || MAS || align=right data-sort-value="0.72" | 720 m || 
|-id=494 bgcolor=#d6d6d6
| 366494 ||  || — || November 7, 2005 || Mauna Kea || A. Boattini || — || align=right | 3.7 km || 
|-id=495 bgcolor=#d6d6d6
| 366495 ||  || — || July 17, 2002 || Socorro || LINEAR || — || align=right | 5.9 km || 
|-id=496 bgcolor=#fefefe
| 366496 ||  || — || July 21, 2002 || Palomar || NEAT || — || align=right data-sort-value="0.90" | 900 m || 
|-id=497 bgcolor=#fefefe
| 366497 ||  || — || July 22, 2002 || Palomar || NEAT || V || align=right data-sort-value="0.60" | 600 m || 
|-id=498 bgcolor=#d6d6d6
| 366498 ||  || — || August 2, 2002 || Campo Imperatore || CINEOS || — || align=right | 3.6 km || 
|-id=499 bgcolor=#fefefe
| 366499 ||  || — || August 3, 2002 || Palomar || NEAT || FLO || align=right data-sort-value="0.81" | 810 m || 
|-id=500 bgcolor=#fefefe
| 366500 ||  || — || August 6, 2002 || Palomar || NEAT || NYS || align=right data-sort-value="0.51" | 510 m || 
|}

366501–366600 

|-bgcolor=#fefefe
| 366501 ||  || — || August 6, 2002 || Palomar || NEAT || V || align=right data-sort-value="0.70" | 700 m || 
|-id=502 bgcolor=#d6d6d6
| 366502 ||  || — || August 8, 2002 || Palomar || NEAT || — || align=right | 2.9 km || 
|-id=503 bgcolor=#d6d6d6
| 366503 ||  || — || August 8, 2002 || Anderson Mesa || LONEOS || — || align=right | 3.8 km || 
|-id=504 bgcolor=#d6d6d6
| 366504 ||  || — || August 3, 2002 || Palomar || NEAT || — || align=right | 4.2 km || 
|-id=505 bgcolor=#d6d6d6
| 366505 ||  || — || August 11, 2002 || Palomar || NEAT || — || align=right | 3.2 km || 
|-id=506 bgcolor=#d6d6d6
| 366506 ||  || — || August 13, 2002 || Palomar || NEAT || TIR || align=right | 3.6 km || 
|-id=507 bgcolor=#d6d6d6
| 366507 ||  || — || August 15, 2002 || Palomar || NEAT || — || align=right | 3.3 km || 
|-id=508 bgcolor=#d6d6d6
| 366508 ||  || — || August 8, 2002 || Palomar || NEAT || — || align=right | 2.8 km || 
|-id=509 bgcolor=#d6d6d6
| 366509 ||  || — || August 8, 2002 || Palomar || S. F. Hönig || VER || align=right | 2.8 km || 
|-id=510 bgcolor=#d6d6d6
| 366510 ||  || — || August 8, 2002 || Palomar || S. F. Hönig || — || align=right | 2.6 km || 
|-id=511 bgcolor=#fefefe
| 366511 ||  || — || August 7, 2002 || Palomar || NEAT || — || align=right data-sort-value="0.81" | 810 m || 
|-id=512 bgcolor=#d6d6d6
| 366512 ||  || — || August 11, 2002 || Palomar || NEAT || TIR || align=right | 2.6 km || 
|-id=513 bgcolor=#d6d6d6
| 366513 ||  || — || August 11, 2002 || Palomar || NEAT || — || align=right | 2.7 km || 
|-id=514 bgcolor=#d6d6d6
| 366514 ||  || — || August 7, 2002 || Palomar || NEAT || THB || align=right | 5.5 km || 
|-id=515 bgcolor=#d6d6d6
| 366515 ||  || — || August 15, 2002 || Palomar || NEAT || — || align=right | 2.6 km || 
|-id=516 bgcolor=#d6d6d6
| 366516 ||  || — || August 15, 2002 || Palomar || NEAT || CRO || align=right | 2.9 km || 
|-id=517 bgcolor=#d6d6d6
| 366517 ||  || — || August 13, 2002 || Palomar || NEAT || — || align=right | 5.5 km || 
|-id=518 bgcolor=#fefefe
| 366518 ||  || — || August 11, 2002 || Palomar || NEAT || — || align=right data-sort-value="0.79" | 790 m || 
|-id=519 bgcolor=#d6d6d6
| 366519 ||  || — || July 14, 2002 || Palomar || NEAT || EOS || align=right | 1.8 km || 
|-id=520 bgcolor=#fefefe
| 366520 ||  || — || August 7, 2002 || Palomar || NEAT || — || align=right data-sort-value="0.81" | 810 m || 
|-id=521 bgcolor=#d6d6d6
| 366521 ||  || — || September 6, 2008 || Mount Lemmon || Mount Lemmon Survey || — || align=right | 3.2 km || 
|-id=522 bgcolor=#d6d6d6
| 366522 ||  || — || November 20, 2003 || Apache Point || SDSS || EOS || align=right | 2.3 km || 
|-id=523 bgcolor=#d6d6d6
| 366523 ||  || — || October 19, 2003 || Palomar || NEAT || VER || align=right | 2.8 km || 
|-id=524 bgcolor=#fefefe
| 366524 ||  || — || September 19, 2006 || Catalina || CSS || V || align=right data-sort-value="0.67" | 670 m || 
|-id=525 bgcolor=#d6d6d6
| 366525 ||  || — || May 6, 2006 || Mount Lemmon || Mount Lemmon Survey || — || align=right | 3.1 km || 
|-id=526 bgcolor=#fefefe
| 366526 ||  || — || August 16, 2002 || Palomar || NEAT || V || align=right data-sort-value="0.74" | 740 m || 
|-id=527 bgcolor=#fefefe
| 366527 ||  || — || August 19, 2002 || Palomar || NEAT || — || align=right data-sort-value="0.74" | 740 m || 
|-id=528 bgcolor=#d6d6d6
| 366528 ||  || — || August 25, 2002 || Palomar || NEAT || EUP || align=right | 3.5 km || 
|-id=529 bgcolor=#fefefe
| 366529 ||  || — || August 26, 2002 || Palomar || NEAT || — || align=right data-sort-value="0.90" | 900 m || 
|-id=530 bgcolor=#fefefe
| 366530 ||  || — || August 28, 2002 || Palomar || NEAT || — || align=right data-sort-value="0.85" | 850 m || 
|-id=531 bgcolor=#fefefe
| 366531 ||  || — || August 27, 2002 || Palomar || S. F. Hönig || — || align=right data-sort-value="0.83" | 830 m || 
|-id=532 bgcolor=#d6d6d6
| 366532 ||  || — || August 29, 2002 || Palomar || S. F. Hönig || THM || align=right | 2.6 km || 
|-id=533 bgcolor=#d6d6d6
| 366533 ||  || — || August 18, 2002 || Palomar || NEAT || LIX || align=right | 4.5 km || 
|-id=534 bgcolor=#d6d6d6
| 366534 ||  || — || August 28, 2002 || Palomar || NEAT || HYG || align=right | 2.6 km || 
|-id=535 bgcolor=#fefefe
| 366535 ||  || — || August 11, 2002 || Haleakala || NEAT || V || align=right data-sort-value="0.69" | 690 m || 
|-id=536 bgcolor=#fefefe
| 366536 ||  || — || August 16, 2002 || Haleakala || NEAT || NYS || align=right data-sort-value="0.53" | 530 m || 
|-id=537 bgcolor=#d6d6d6
| 366537 ||  || — || August 16, 2002 || Palomar || NEAT || — || align=right | 2.4 km || 
|-id=538 bgcolor=#d6d6d6
| 366538 ||  || — || August 27, 2002 || Palomar || NEAT || — || align=right | 2.5 km || 
|-id=539 bgcolor=#fefefe
| 366539 ||  || — || August 19, 2002 || Palomar || NEAT || — || align=right data-sort-value="0.85" | 850 m || 
|-id=540 bgcolor=#fefefe
| 366540 ||  || — || August 30, 2002 || Palomar || NEAT || — || align=right data-sort-value="0.83" | 830 m || 
|-id=541 bgcolor=#fefefe
| 366541 ||  || — || August 16, 2002 || Palomar || NEAT || NYS || align=right data-sort-value="0.62" | 620 m || 
|-id=542 bgcolor=#fefefe
| 366542 ||  || — || August 18, 2002 || Palomar || NEAT || MAS || align=right data-sort-value="0.75" | 750 m || 
|-id=543 bgcolor=#fefefe
| 366543 ||  || — || August 17, 2002 || Palomar || NEAT || NYS || align=right data-sort-value="0.74" | 740 m || 
|-id=544 bgcolor=#d6d6d6
| 366544 ||  || — || August 17, 2002 || Palomar || NEAT || VER || align=right | 2.6 km || 
|-id=545 bgcolor=#d6d6d6
| 366545 ||  || — || August 17, 2002 || Palomar || NEAT || — || align=right | 3.2 km || 
|-id=546 bgcolor=#d6d6d6
| 366546 ||  || — || August 28, 2002 || Palomar || NEAT || HYG || align=right | 2.4 km || 
|-id=547 bgcolor=#fefefe
| 366547 ||  || — || August 16, 2002 || Palomar || NEAT || NYS || align=right data-sort-value="0.52" | 520 m || 
|-id=548 bgcolor=#d6d6d6
| 366548 ||  || — || December 12, 2004 || Apache Point || SDSS || — || align=right | 3.1 km || 
|-id=549 bgcolor=#fefefe
| 366549 ||  || — || August 17, 2002 || Palomar || NEAT || MAS || align=right data-sort-value="0.51" | 510 m || 
|-id=550 bgcolor=#d6d6d6
| 366550 ||  || — || October 10, 2002 || Apache Point || SDSS || — || align=right | 3.0 km || 
|-id=551 bgcolor=#fefefe
| 366551 ||  || — || December 30, 2007 || Kitt Peak || Spacewatch || — || align=right data-sort-value="0.88" | 880 m || 
|-id=552 bgcolor=#fefefe
| 366552 ||  || — || May 1, 2009 || Mount Lemmon || Mount Lemmon Survey || V || align=right data-sort-value="0.65" | 650 m || 
|-id=553 bgcolor=#d6d6d6
| 366553 ||  || — || January 17, 2005 || Kitt Peak || Spacewatch || VER || align=right | 3.4 km || 
|-id=554 bgcolor=#fefefe
| 366554 ||  || — || September 4, 2002 || Anderson Mesa || LONEOS || MAS || align=right data-sort-value="0.99" | 990 m || 
|-id=555 bgcolor=#fefefe
| 366555 ||  || — || September 3, 2002 || Haleakala || NEAT || — || align=right | 1.1 km || 
|-id=556 bgcolor=#fefefe
| 366556 ||  || — || September 5, 2002 || Socorro || LINEAR || NYS || align=right data-sort-value="0.67" | 670 m || 
|-id=557 bgcolor=#d6d6d6
| 366557 ||  || — || September 10, 2002 || Haleakala || NEAT || — || align=right | 4.1 km || 
|-id=558 bgcolor=#d6d6d6
| 366558 ||  || — || September 13, 2002 || Palomar || NEAT || THB || align=right | 3.7 km || 
|-id=559 bgcolor=#fefefe
| 366559 ||  || — || September 14, 2002 || Haleakala || NEAT || — || align=right data-sort-value="0.83" | 830 m || 
|-id=560 bgcolor=#d6d6d6
| 366560 ||  || — || September 11, 2002 || Palomar || NEAT || THB || align=right | 3.4 km || 
|-id=561 bgcolor=#d6d6d6
| 366561 ||  || — || September 11, 2002 || Palomar || NEAT || — || align=right | 4.4 km || 
|-id=562 bgcolor=#d6d6d6
| 366562 ||  || — || September 13, 2002 || Palomar || NEAT || THM || align=right | 2.6 km || 
|-id=563 bgcolor=#d6d6d6
| 366563 ||  || — || September 13, 2002 || Anderson Mesa || LONEOS || — || align=right | 4.0 km || 
|-id=564 bgcolor=#fefefe
| 366564 ||  || — || September 15, 2002 || Xinglong || SCAP || — || align=right data-sort-value="0.70" | 700 m || 
|-id=565 bgcolor=#fefefe
| 366565 ||  || — || September 14, 2002 || Palomar || NEAT || NYS || align=right data-sort-value="0.56" | 560 m || 
|-id=566 bgcolor=#fefefe
| 366566 ||  || — || September 14, 2002 || Palomar || NEAT || NYS || align=right data-sort-value="0.55" | 550 m || 
|-id=567 bgcolor=#E9E9E9
| 366567 ||  || — || September 13, 2002 || Palomar || NEAT || — || align=right | 1.1 km || 
|-id=568 bgcolor=#fefefe
| 366568 ||  || — || September 11, 2002 || Palomar || NEAT || SUL || align=right | 1.7 km || 
|-id=569 bgcolor=#d6d6d6
| 366569 ||  || — || August 17, 2002 || Palomar || NEAT || — || align=right | 2.6 km || 
|-id=570 bgcolor=#fefefe
| 366570 ||  || — || September 27, 2002 || Palomar || NEAT || CIM || align=right | 4.1 km || 
|-id=571 bgcolor=#fefefe
| 366571 ||  || — || September 30, 2002 || Haleakala || NEAT || MAS || align=right data-sort-value="0.95" | 950 m || 
|-id=572 bgcolor=#fefefe
| 366572 ||  || — || September 16, 2002 || Palomar || NEAT || NYS || align=right data-sort-value="0.76" | 760 m || 
|-id=573 bgcolor=#fefefe
| 366573 ||  || — || October 2, 2002 || Socorro || LINEAR || NYS || align=right data-sort-value="0.74" | 740 m || 
|-id=574 bgcolor=#fefefe
| 366574 ||  || — || August 24, 1998 || Caussols || ODAS || NYS || align=right data-sort-value="0.86" | 860 m || 
|-id=575 bgcolor=#d6d6d6
| 366575 ||  || — || October 2, 2002 || Socorro || LINEAR || — || align=right | 2.9 km || 
|-id=576 bgcolor=#fefefe
| 366576 ||  || — || October 2, 2002 || Socorro || LINEAR || NYS || align=right data-sort-value="0.79" | 790 m || 
|-id=577 bgcolor=#fefefe
| 366577 ||  || — || October 3, 2002 || Socorro || LINEAR || — || align=right | 1.8 km || 
|-id=578 bgcolor=#fefefe
| 366578 ||  || — || October 2, 2002 || Socorro || LINEAR || MAS || align=right data-sort-value="0.73" | 730 m || 
|-id=579 bgcolor=#fefefe
| 366579 ||  || — || October 4, 2002 || Socorro || LINEAR || — || align=right data-sort-value="0.95" | 950 m || 
|-id=580 bgcolor=#d6d6d6
| 366580 ||  || — || October 4, 2002 || Palomar || NEAT || — || align=right | 3.7 km || 
|-id=581 bgcolor=#fefefe
| 366581 ||  || — || October 4, 2002 || Socorro || LINEAR || ERI || align=right | 1.5 km || 
|-id=582 bgcolor=#E9E9E9
| 366582 ||  || — || September 25, 2006 || Catalina || CSS || — || align=right | 1.3 km || 
|-id=583 bgcolor=#d6d6d6
| 366583 ||  || — || October 14, 2002 || Palomar || NEAT || EUP || align=right | 6.9 km || 
|-id=584 bgcolor=#d6d6d6
| 366584 ||  || — || October 5, 2002 || Socorro || LINEAR || — || align=right | 2.9 km || 
|-id=585 bgcolor=#fefefe
| 366585 ||  || — || October 3, 2002 || Socorro || LINEAR || ERI || align=right | 1.9 km || 
|-id=586 bgcolor=#d6d6d6
| 366586 ||  || — || October 7, 2002 || Haleakala || NEAT || MEL || align=right | 5.0 km || 
|-id=587 bgcolor=#fefefe
| 366587 ||  || — || October 5, 2002 || Socorro || LINEAR || — || align=right | 1.1 km || 
|-id=588 bgcolor=#d6d6d6
| 366588 ||  || — || October 6, 2002 || Socorro || LINEAR || — || align=right | 5.9 km || 
|-id=589 bgcolor=#fefefe
| 366589 ||  || — || October 15, 2002 || Palomar || NEAT || — || align=right | 1.0 km || 
|-id=590 bgcolor=#d6d6d6
| 366590 ||  || — || October 5, 2002 || Apache Point || SDSS || EOS || align=right | 2.0 km || 
|-id=591 bgcolor=#fefefe
| 366591 ||  || — || October 5, 2002 || Apache Point || SDSS || — || align=right data-sort-value="0.98" | 980 m || 
|-id=592 bgcolor=#fefefe
| 366592 ||  || — || October 28, 2002 || Palomar || NEAT || — || align=right | 1.0 km || 
|-id=593 bgcolor=#d6d6d6
| 366593 ||  || — || October 30, 2002 || Kitt Peak || Spacewatch || — || align=right | 3.8 km || 
|-id=594 bgcolor=#fefefe
| 366594 ||  || — || October 31, 2002 || Palomar || NEAT || NYS || align=right data-sort-value="0.68" | 680 m || 
|-id=595 bgcolor=#fefefe
| 366595 ||  || — || October 31, 2002 || Socorro || LINEAR || — || align=right data-sort-value="0.82" | 820 m || 
|-id=596 bgcolor=#fefefe
| 366596 ||  || — || November 7, 2002 || Socorro || LINEAR || — || align=right | 1.1 km || 
|-id=597 bgcolor=#FA8072
| 366597 ||  || — || November 12, 2002 || Socorro || LINEAR || — || align=right data-sort-value="0.79" | 790 m || 
|-id=598 bgcolor=#fefefe
| 366598 ||  || — || November 12, 2002 || Socorro || LINEAR || — || align=right | 1.0 km || 
|-id=599 bgcolor=#FA8072
| 366599 ||  || — || December 2, 2002 || Socorro || LINEAR || — || align=right | 1.1 km || 
|-id=600 bgcolor=#E9E9E9
| 366600 ||  || — || December 11, 2002 || Socorro || LINEAR || MAR || align=right | 1.4 km || 
|}

366601–366700 

|-bgcolor=#fefefe
| 366601 ||  || — || January 4, 2003 || Socorro || LINEAR || — || align=right data-sort-value="0.94" | 940 m || 
|-id=602 bgcolor=#E9E9E9
| 366602 ||  || — || January 5, 2003 || Socorro || LINEAR || — || align=right | 1.7 km || 
|-id=603 bgcolor=#E9E9E9
| 366603 ||  || — || January 26, 2003 || Palomar || NEAT || — || align=right | 2.6 km || 
|-id=604 bgcolor=#E9E9E9
| 366604 ||  || — || January 27, 2003 || Socorro || LINEAR || — || align=right | 2.1 km || 
|-id=605 bgcolor=#E9E9E9
| 366605 ||  || — || January 30, 2003 || Palomar || NEAT || — || align=right | 1.8 km || 
|-id=606 bgcolor=#E9E9E9
| 366606 ||  || — || January 28, 2003 || Palomar || NEAT || HNS || align=right | 1.4 km || 
|-id=607 bgcolor=#E9E9E9
| 366607 ||  || — || February 6, 2003 || Kitt Peak || Spacewatch || — || align=right data-sort-value="0.98" | 980 m || 
|-id=608 bgcolor=#E9E9E9
| 366608 ||  || — || February 7, 2003 || Desert Eagle || W. K. Y. Yeung || — || align=right | 3.1 km || 
|-id=609 bgcolor=#E9E9E9
| 366609 ||  || — || February 22, 2003 || Palomar || NEAT || DOR || align=right | 2.7 km || 
|-id=610 bgcolor=#E9E9E9
| 366610 ||  || — || February 2, 2003 || Anderson Mesa || LONEOS || — || align=right | 2.4 km || 
|-id=611 bgcolor=#E9E9E9
| 366611 ||  || — || March 24, 2003 || Haleakala || NEAT || CLO || align=right | 2.4 km || 
|-id=612 bgcolor=#E9E9E9
| 366612 ||  || — || March 26, 2003 || Palomar || NEAT || EUN || align=right | 1.5 km || 
|-id=613 bgcolor=#E9E9E9
| 366613 ||  || — || March 26, 2003 || Palomar || NEAT || CLO || align=right | 2.6 km || 
|-id=614 bgcolor=#E9E9E9
| 366614 ||  || — || March 8, 2003 || Anderson Mesa || LONEOS || — || align=right | 2.1 km || 
|-id=615 bgcolor=#FFC2E0
| 366615 ||  || — || June 10, 2003 || Socorro || LINEAR || AMO +1km || align=right | 1.5 km || 
|-id=616 bgcolor=#FA8072
| 366616 ||  || — || July 5, 2003 || Socorro || LINEAR || — || align=right | 1.4 km || 
|-id=617 bgcolor=#FA8072
| 366617 ||  || — || July 24, 2003 || Palomar || NEAT || — || align=right data-sort-value="0.81" | 810 m || 
|-id=618 bgcolor=#fefefe
| 366618 ||  || — || July 20, 2003 || Palomar || NEAT || H || align=right data-sort-value="0.80" | 800 m || 
|-id=619 bgcolor=#d6d6d6
| 366619 ||  || — || July 3, 2003 || Kitt Peak || Spacewatch || EOS || align=right | 2.8 km || 
|-id=620 bgcolor=#fefefe
| 366620 ||  || — || August 22, 2003 || Socorro || LINEAR || FLO || align=right data-sort-value="0.67" | 670 m || 
|-id=621 bgcolor=#fefefe
| 366621 ||  || — || August 23, 2003 || Palomar || NEAT || — || align=right data-sort-value="0.83" | 830 m || 
|-id=622 bgcolor=#fefefe
| 366622 ||  || — || August 23, 2003 || Socorro || LINEAR || — || align=right data-sort-value="0.84" | 840 m || 
|-id=623 bgcolor=#fefefe
| 366623 ||  || — || August 23, 2003 || Palomar || NEAT || FLO || align=right data-sort-value="0.66" | 660 m || 
|-id=624 bgcolor=#d6d6d6
| 366624 ||  || — || August 23, 2003 || Palomar || NEAT || — || align=right | 5.7 km || 
|-id=625 bgcolor=#fefefe
| 366625 ||  || — || September 14, 2003 || Haleakala || NEAT || — || align=right data-sort-value="0.78" | 780 m || 
|-id=626 bgcolor=#d6d6d6
| 366626 ||  || — || September 15, 2003 || Anderson Mesa || LONEOS || — || align=right | 2.7 km || 
|-id=627 bgcolor=#d6d6d6
| 366627 ||  || — || September 17, 2003 || Kitt Peak || Spacewatch || — || align=right | 2.6 km || 
|-id=628 bgcolor=#d6d6d6
| 366628 ||  || — || September 16, 2003 || Palomar || NEAT || — || align=right | 5.3 km || 
|-id=629 bgcolor=#d6d6d6
| 366629 ||  || — || September 7, 2003 || Kvistaberg || UDAS || — || align=right | 3.6 km || 
|-id=630 bgcolor=#d6d6d6
| 366630 ||  || — || September 18, 2003 || Kitt Peak || Spacewatch || — || align=right | 2.9 km || 
|-id=631 bgcolor=#d6d6d6
| 366631 ||  || — || September 18, 2003 || Kitt Peak || Spacewatch || — || align=right | 3.6 km || 
|-id=632 bgcolor=#fefefe
| 366632 ||  || — || September 18, 2003 || Socorro || LINEAR || — || align=right data-sort-value="0.86" | 860 m || 
|-id=633 bgcolor=#d6d6d6
| 366633 ||  || — || September 20, 2003 || Kitt Peak || Spacewatch || — || align=right | 2.3 km || 
|-id=634 bgcolor=#d6d6d6
| 366634 ||  || — || September 16, 2003 || Kitt Peak || Spacewatch || — || align=right | 3.8 km || 
|-id=635 bgcolor=#fefefe
| 366635 ||  || — || September 17, 2003 || Črni Vrh || Črni Vrh || — || align=right | 1.0 km || 
|-id=636 bgcolor=#d6d6d6
| 366636 ||  || — || September 18, 2003 || Goodricke-Pigott || R. A. Tucker || — || align=right | 2.9 km || 
|-id=637 bgcolor=#fefefe
| 366637 ||  || — || September 19, 2003 || Palomar || NEAT || — || align=right data-sort-value="0.88" | 880 m || 
|-id=638 bgcolor=#d6d6d6
| 366638 ||  || — || September 20, 2003 || Palomar || NEAT || 7:4 || align=right | 3.8 km || 
|-id=639 bgcolor=#d6d6d6
| 366639 ||  || — || September 2, 2003 || Socorro || LINEAR || — || align=right | 3.2 km || 
|-id=640 bgcolor=#fefefe
| 366640 ||  || — || September 22, 2003 || Anderson Mesa || LONEOS || — || align=right data-sort-value="0.49" | 490 m || 
|-id=641 bgcolor=#fefefe
| 366641 ||  || — || September 18, 2003 || Palomar || NEAT || FLO || align=right data-sort-value="0.74" | 740 m || 
|-id=642 bgcolor=#fefefe
| 366642 ||  || — || September 26, 2003 || Socorro || LINEAR || NYS || align=right data-sort-value="0.79" | 790 m || 
|-id=643 bgcolor=#d6d6d6
| 366643 ||  || — || September 26, 2003 || Socorro || LINEAR || EUP || align=right | 6.4 km || 
|-id=644 bgcolor=#fefefe
| 366644 ||  || — || September 19, 2003 || Socorro || LINEAR || — || align=right data-sort-value="0.79" | 790 m || 
|-id=645 bgcolor=#d6d6d6
| 366645 ||  || — || September 27, 2003 || Socorro || LINEAR || — || align=right | 3.0 km || 
|-id=646 bgcolor=#d6d6d6
| 366646 ||  || — || September 29, 2003 || Socorro || LINEAR || — || align=right | 2.8 km || 
|-id=647 bgcolor=#d6d6d6
| 366647 ||  || — || September 30, 2003 || Socorro || LINEAR || — || align=right | 3.5 km || 
|-id=648 bgcolor=#d6d6d6
| 366648 ||  || — || September 30, 2003 || Socorro || LINEAR || — || align=right | 2.7 km || 
|-id=649 bgcolor=#d6d6d6
| 366649 ||  || — || September 19, 2003 || Palomar || NEAT || — || align=right | 4.2 km || 
|-id=650 bgcolor=#fefefe
| 366650 ||  || — || September 20, 2003 || Palomar || NEAT || FLO || align=right data-sort-value="0.55" | 550 m || 
|-id=651 bgcolor=#fefefe
| 366651 ||  || — || September 18, 2003 || Haleakala || NEAT || — || align=right | 1.1 km || 
|-id=652 bgcolor=#d6d6d6
| 366652 ||  || — || September 18, 2003 || Haleakala || NEAT || — || align=right | 2.5 km || 
|-id=653 bgcolor=#d6d6d6
| 366653 ||  || — || September 22, 2003 || Anderson Mesa || LONEOS || — || align=right | 2.2 km || 
|-id=654 bgcolor=#fefefe
| 366654 ||  || — || September 17, 2003 || Kitt Peak || Spacewatch || — || align=right | 1.3 km || 
|-id=655 bgcolor=#fefefe
| 366655 ||  || — || September 22, 2003 || Kitt Peak || Spacewatch || — || align=right data-sort-value="0.55" | 550 m || 
|-id=656 bgcolor=#d6d6d6
| 366656 ||  || — || September 28, 2003 || Anderson Mesa || LONEOS || — || align=right | 3.1 km || 
|-id=657 bgcolor=#fefefe
| 366657 ||  || — || September 28, 2003 || Kitt Peak || Spacewatch || — || align=right data-sort-value="0.94" | 940 m || 
|-id=658 bgcolor=#fefefe
| 366658 ||  || — || September 26, 2003 || Apache Point || SDSS || V || align=right data-sort-value="0.74" | 740 m || 
|-id=659 bgcolor=#d6d6d6
| 366659 ||  || — || September 26, 2003 || Apache Point || SDSS || — || align=right | 3.5 km || 
|-id=660 bgcolor=#d6d6d6
| 366660 ||  || — || September 26, 2003 || Apache Point || SDSS || — || align=right | 2.7 km || 
|-id=661 bgcolor=#d6d6d6
| 366661 ||  || — || September 17, 2003 || Kitt Peak || Spacewatch || — || align=right | 2.2 km || 
|-id=662 bgcolor=#fefefe
| 366662 ||  || — || September 18, 2003 || Socorro || LINEAR || — || align=right data-sort-value="0.84" | 840 m || 
|-id=663 bgcolor=#d6d6d6
| 366663 ||  || — || October 23, 2003 || Kitt Peak || Spacewatch || — || align=right | 3.4 km || 
|-id=664 bgcolor=#fefefe
| 366664 ||  || — || September 21, 2003 || Kitt Peak || Spacewatch || V || align=right data-sort-value="0.62" | 620 m || 
|-id=665 bgcolor=#d6d6d6
| 366665 ||  || — || September 20, 2003 || Kitt Peak || Spacewatch || — || align=right | 2.5 km || 
|-id=666 bgcolor=#d6d6d6
| 366666 ||  || — || October 1, 2003 || Kitt Peak || Spacewatch || — || align=right | 4.5 km || 
|-id=667 bgcolor=#d6d6d6
| 366667 ||  || — || September 20, 2003 || Kitt Peak || Spacewatch || — || align=right | 3.1 km || 
|-id=668 bgcolor=#fefefe
| 366668 ||  || — || October 16, 2003 || Socorro || LINEAR || H || align=right data-sort-value="0.67" | 670 m || 
|-id=669 bgcolor=#d6d6d6
| 366669 ||  || — || October 16, 2003 || Palomar || NEAT || — || align=right | 4.0 km || 
|-id=670 bgcolor=#d6d6d6
| 366670 ||  || — || October 16, 2003 || Socorro || LINEAR || EUP || align=right | 6.0 km || 
|-id=671 bgcolor=#fefefe
| 366671 ||  || — || October 16, 2003 || Anderson Mesa || LONEOS || H || align=right data-sort-value="0.86" | 860 m || 
|-id=672 bgcolor=#d6d6d6
| 366672 ||  || — || October 16, 2003 || Campo Imperatore || CINEOS || — || align=right | 3.5 km || 
|-id=673 bgcolor=#d6d6d6
| 366673 ||  || — || October 16, 2003 || Palomar || NEAT || — || align=right | 3.6 km || 
|-id=674 bgcolor=#d6d6d6
| 366674 ||  || — || October 16, 2003 || Kitt Peak || Spacewatch || — || align=right | 2.2 km || 
|-id=675 bgcolor=#fefefe
| 366675 ||  || — || September 17, 2003 || Palomar || NEAT || — || align=right data-sort-value="0.71" | 710 m || 
|-id=676 bgcolor=#d6d6d6
| 366676 ||  || — || October 17, 2003 || Anderson Mesa || LONEOS || — || align=right | 4.2 km || 
|-id=677 bgcolor=#d6d6d6
| 366677 ||  || — || October 18, 2003 || Palomar || NEAT || — || align=right | 2.9 km || 
|-id=678 bgcolor=#fefefe
| 366678 ||  || — || October 17, 2003 || Kitt Peak || Spacewatch || FLO || align=right data-sort-value="0.63" | 630 m || 
|-id=679 bgcolor=#d6d6d6
| 366679 ||  || — || October 20, 2003 || Palomar || NEAT || — || align=right | 4.7 km || 
|-id=680 bgcolor=#fefefe
| 366680 ||  || — || October 20, 2003 || Palomar || NEAT || — || align=right | 1.3 km || 
|-id=681 bgcolor=#fefefe
| 366681 ||  || — || October 20, 2003 || Socorro || LINEAR || — || align=right data-sort-value="0.79" | 790 m || 
|-id=682 bgcolor=#fefefe
| 366682 ||  || — || October 21, 2003 || Socorro || LINEAR || FLO || align=right data-sort-value="0.67" | 670 m || 
|-id=683 bgcolor=#d6d6d6
| 366683 ||  || — || October 24, 2003 || Kitt Peak || Spacewatch || HYG || align=right | 3.4 km || 
|-id=684 bgcolor=#fefefe
| 366684 ||  || — || October 18, 2003 || Anderson Mesa || LONEOS || — || align=right data-sort-value="0.75" | 750 m || 
|-id=685 bgcolor=#fefefe
| 366685 ||  || — || October 28, 2003 || Socorro || LINEAR || FLO || align=right data-sort-value="0.87" | 870 m || 
|-id=686 bgcolor=#FA8072
| 366686 ||  || — || October 29, 2003 || Socorro || LINEAR || — || align=right data-sort-value="0.72" | 720 m || 
|-id=687 bgcolor=#fefefe
| 366687 ||  || — || October 30, 2003 || Socorro || LINEAR || — || align=right | 1.1 km || 
|-id=688 bgcolor=#d6d6d6
| 366688 ||  || — || October 23, 2003 || Kitt Peak || Spacewatch || HYG || align=right | 2.6 km || 
|-id=689 bgcolor=#fefefe
| 366689 Rohrbaugh ||  ||  || September 27, 2003 || Kitt Peak || Spacewatch || — || align=right data-sort-value="0.76" | 760 m || 
|-id=690 bgcolor=#fefefe
| 366690 ||  || — || October 18, 2003 || Kitt Peak || Spacewatch || — || align=right data-sort-value="0.92" | 920 m || 
|-id=691 bgcolor=#fefefe
| 366691 ||  || — || October 19, 2003 || Apache Point || SDSS || FLO || align=right data-sort-value="0.62" | 620 m || 
|-id=692 bgcolor=#d6d6d6
| 366692 ||  || — || October 20, 2003 || Kitt Peak || Spacewatch || — || align=right | 2.8 km || 
|-id=693 bgcolor=#fefefe
| 366693 ||  || — || October 20, 2003 || Kitt Peak || Spacewatch || NYS || align=right | 1.2 km || 
|-id=694 bgcolor=#d6d6d6
| 366694 ||  || — || September 27, 2003 || Apache Point || SDSS || — || align=right | 3.1 km || 
|-id=695 bgcolor=#fefefe
| 366695 ||  || — || October 23, 2003 || Apache Point || SDSS || H || align=right data-sort-value="0.71" | 710 m || 
|-id=696 bgcolor=#fefefe
| 366696 ||  || — || October 23, 2003 || Apache Point || SDSS || — || align=right data-sort-value="0.76" | 760 m || 
|-id=697 bgcolor=#d6d6d6
| 366697 ||  || — || November 18, 2003 || Palomar || NEAT || EOS || align=right | 2.7 km || 
|-id=698 bgcolor=#d6d6d6
| 366698 ||  || — || November 18, 2003 || Palomar || NEAT || — || align=right | 3.2 km || 
|-id=699 bgcolor=#d6d6d6
| 366699 ||  || — || November 19, 2003 || Kitt Peak || Spacewatch || — || align=right | 3.3 km || 
|-id=700 bgcolor=#d6d6d6
| 366700 ||  || — || November 19, 2003 || Socorro || LINEAR || — || align=right | 3.1 km || 
|}

366701–366800 

|-bgcolor=#fefefe
| 366701 ||  || — || November 19, 2003 || Kitt Peak || Spacewatch || NYS || align=right data-sort-value="0.79" | 790 m || 
|-id=702 bgcolor=#d6d6d6
| 366702 ||  || — || November 21, 2003 || Kitt Peak || Spacewatch || — || align=right | 3.1 km || 
|-id=703 bgcolor=#fefefe
| 366703 ||  || — || November 20, 2003 || Socorro || LINEAR || — || align=right data-sort-value="0.85" | 850 m || 
|-id=704 bgcolor=#fefefe
| 366704 ||  || — || November 24, 2003 || Socorro || LINEAR || H || align=right data-sort-value="0.85" | 850 m || 
|-id=705 bgcolor=#fefefe
| 366705 ||  || — || October 25, 2003 || Socorro || LINEAR || — || align=right | 1.1 km || 
|-id=706 bgcolor=#fefefe
| 366706 ||  || — || November 20, 2003 || Socorro || LINEAR || — || align=right data-sort-value="0.84" | 840 m || 
|-id=707 bgcolor=#d6d6d6
| 366707 ||  || — || November 21, 2003 || Socorro || LINEAR || THM || align=right | 4.8 km || 
|-id=708 bgcolor=#fefefe
| 366708 ||  || — || November 21, 2003 || Socorro || LINEAR || NYS || align=right data-sort-value="0.78" | 780 m || 
|-id=709 bgcolor=#FA8072
| 366709 ||  || — || November 21, 2003 || Socorro || LINEAR || — || align=right | 3.4 km || 
|-id=710 bgcolor=#d6d6d6
| 366710 ||  || — || November 21, 2003 || Socorro || LINEAR || — || align=right | 2.5 km || 
|-id=711 bgcolor=#fefefe
| 366711 ||  || — || November 26, 2003 || Kitt Peak || Spacewatch || — || align=right data-sort-value="0.88" | 880 m || 
|-id=712 bgcolor=#d6d6d6
| 366712 ||  || — || November 26, 2003 || Kitt Peak || Spacewatch || — || align=right | 3.7 km || 
|-id=713 bgcolor=#fefefe
| 366713 ||  || — || November 30, 2003 || Kitt Peak || Spacewatch || FLO || align=right data-sort-value="0.66" | 660 m || 
|-id=714 bgcolor=#d6d6d6
| 366714 ||  || — || December 5, 2003 || Catalina || CSS || — || align=right | 3.6 km || 
|-id=715 bgcolor=#fefefe
| 366715 ||  || — || December 1, 2003 || Kitt Peak || Spacewatch || NYS || align=right data-sort-value="0.80" | 800 m || 
|-id=716 bgcolor=#fefefe
| 366716 ||  || — || November 19, 2003 || Kitt Peak || Spacewatch || — || align=right data-sort-value="0.70" | 700 m || 
|-id=717 bgcolor=#d6d6d6
| 366717 ||  || — || December 1, 2003 || Kitt Peak || Spacewatch || — || align=right | 3.7 km || 
|-id=718 bgcolor=#d6d6d6
| 366718 ||  || — || November 23, 2003 || Kitt Peak || Spacewatch || — || align=right | 3.9 km || 
|-id=719 bgcolor=#d6d6d6
| 366719 ||  || — || December 17, 2003 || Socorro || LINEAR || EUP || align=right | 5.0 km || 
|-id=720 bgcolor=#fefefe
| 366720 ||  || — || December 17, 2003 || Črni Vrh || Črni Vrh || — || align=right | 1.3 km || 
|-id=721 bgcolor=#d6d6d6
| 366721 ||  || — || December 17, 2003 || Kitt Peak || Spacewatch || — || align=right | 3.6 km || 
|-id=722 bgcolor=#d6d6d6
| 366722 ||  || — || December 19, 2003 || Socorro || LINEAR || — || align=right | 4.5 km || 
|-id=723 bgcolor=#d6d6d6
| 366723 ||  || — || December 22, 2003 || Socorro || LINEAR || LIX || align=right | 5.4 km || 
|-id=724 bgcolor=#fefefe
| 366724 ||  || — || December 27, 2003 || Socorro || LINEAR || H || align=right data-sort-value="0.68" | 680 m || 
|-id=725 bgcolor=#E9E9E9
| 366725 ||  || — || December 28, 2003 || Socorro || LINEAR || — || align=right | 1.4 km || 
|-id=726 bgcolor=#fefefe
| 366726 ||  || — || December 21, 2003 || Apache Point || SDSS || H || align=right data-sort-value="0.94" | 940 m || 
|-id=727 bgcolor=#fefefe
| 366727 ||  || — || January 16, 2004 || Palomar || NEAT || H || align=right data-sort-value="0.78" | 780 m || 
|-id=728 bgcolor=#fefefe
| 366728 ||  || — || January 22, 2004 || Socorro || LINEAR || NYS || align=right data-sort-value="0.67" | 670 m || 
|-id=729 bgcolor=#fefefe
| 366729 ||  || — || January 24, 2004 || Socorro || LINEAR || H || align=right data-sort-value="0.74" | 740 m || 
|-id=730 bgcolor=#E9E9E9
| 366730 ||  || — || January 31, 2004 || Socorro || LINEAR || — || align=right | 2.3 km || 
|-id=731 bgcolor=#E9E9E9
| 366731 ||  || — || January 28, 2004 || Catalina || CSS || — || align=right | 1.0 km || 
|-id=732 bgcolor=#fefefe
| 366732 ||  || — || January 28, 2004 || Socorro || LINEAR || H || align=right data-sort-value="0.78" | 780 m || 
|-id=733 bgcolor=#FFC2E0
| 366733 ||  || — || January 30, 2004 || Kitt Peak || Spacewatch || AMO || align=right data-sort-value="0.53" | 530 m || 
|-id=734 bgcolor=#E9E9E9
| 366734 ||  || — || February 12, 2004 || Palomar || NEAT || — || align=right data-sort-value="0.99" | 990 m || 
|-id=735 bgcolor=#E9E9E9
| 366735 ||  || — || March 11, 2004 || Palomar || NEAT || — || align=right | 1.3 km || 
|-id=736 bgcolor=#FA8072
| 366736 ||  || — || March 13, 2004 || Palomar || NEAT || — || align=right | 2.5 km || 
|-id=737 bgcolor=#E9E9E9
| 366737 ||  || — || March 30, 2004 || Socorro || LINEAR || BAR || align=right | 1.6 km || 
|-id=738 bgcolor=#E9E9E9
| 366738 ||  || — || March 17, 2004 || Kitt Peak || Spacewatch || — || align=right | 1.5 km || 
|-id=739 bgcolor=#E9E9E9
| 366739 ||  || — || March 15, 2004 || Socorro || LINEAR || — || align=right | 2.6 km || 
|-id=740 bgcolor=#E9E9E9
| 366740 ||  || — || April 10, 2004 || Palomar || NEAT || JUN || align=right | 1.4 km || 
|-id=741 bgcolor=#E9E9E9
| 366741 ||  || — || April 11, 2004 || Palomar || NEAT || — || align=right | 1.6 km || 
|-id=742 bgcolor=#E9E9E9
| 366742 ||  || — || April 20, 2004 || Kitt Peak || Spacewatch || — || align=right | 2.0 km || 
|-id=743 bgcolor=#E9E9E9
| 366743 ||  || — || May 9, 2004 || Kitt Peak || Spacewatch || NEM || align=right | 2.5 km || 
|-id=744 bgcolor=#E9E9E9
| 366744 ||  || — || May 10, 2004 || Palomar || NEAT || — || align=right | 1.7 km || 
|-id=745 bgcolor=#E9E9E9
| 366745 ||  || — || May 21, 2004 || Kitt Peak || Spacewatch || — || align=right | 1.6 km || 
|-id=746 bgcolor=#FFC2E0
| 366746 ||  || — || June 9, 2004 || Socorro || LINEAR || APOPHA || align=right data-sort-value="0.33" | 330 m || 
|-id=747 bgcolor=#E9E9E9
| 366747 ||  || — || July 11, 2004 || Socorro || LINEAR || — || align=right | 3.5 km || 
|-id=748 bgcolor=#E9E9E9
| 366748 ||  || — || August 5, 2004 || Palomar || NEAT || RAF || align=right | 1.3 km || 
|-id=749 bgcolor=#E9E9E9
| 366749 ||  || — || August 6, 2004 || Palomar || NEAT || — || align=right | 3.6 km || 
|-id=750 bgcolor=#E9E9E9
| 366750 ||  || — || August 6, 2004 || Palomar || NEAT || DOR || align=right | 2.8 km || 
|-id=751 bgcolor=#E9E9E9
| 366751 ||  || — || August 8, 2004 || Socorro || LINEAR || — || align=right | 2.9 km || 
|-id=752 bgcolor=#E9E9E9
| 366752 ||  || — || August 8, 2004 || Palomar || NEAT || AEO || align=right | 1.3 km || 
|-id=753 bgcolor=#E9E9E9
| 366753 ||  || — || August 8, 2004 || Palomar || NEAT || GEF || align=right | 1.4 km || 
|-id=754 bgcolor=#E9E9E9
| 366754 ||  || — || July 30, 2004 || Anderson Mesa || LONEOS || CLO || align=right | 3.2 km || 
|-id=755 bgcolor=#E9E9E9
| 366755 ||  || — || September 6, 2004 || Palomar || NEAT || — || align=right | 2.9 km || 
|-id=756 bgcolor=#E9E9E9
| 366756 ||  || — || September 7, 2004 || Socorro || LINEAR || — || align=right | 2.0 km || 
|-id=757 bgcolor=#E9E9E9
| 366757 ||  || — || September 7, 2004 || Kitt Peak || Spacewatch || — || align=right | 2.0 km || 
|-id=758 bgcolor=#E9E9E9
| 366758 ||  || — || September 8, 2004 || Socorro || LINEAR || MRX || align=right | 1.1 km || 
|-id=759 bgcolor=#E9E9E9
| 366759 ||  || — || September 7, 2004 || Kitt Peak || Spacewatch || AGN || align=right | 1.2 km || 
|-id=760 bgcolor=#E9E9E9
| 366760 ||  || — || September 8, 2004 || Socorro || LINEAR || HNA || align=right | 2.2 km || 
|-id=761 bgcolor=#d6d6d6
| 366761 ||  || — || September 7, 2004 || Kitt Peak || Spacewatch || KAR || align=right | 1.1 km || 
|-id=762 bgcolor=#E9E9E9
| 366762 ||  || — || September 7, 2004 || Kitt Peak || Spacewatch || HOF || align=right | 2.5 km || 
|-id=763 bgcolor=#d6d6d6
| 366763 ||  || — || September 8, 2004 || Socorro || LINEAR || — || align=right | 2.9 km || 
|-id=764 bgcolor=#E9E9E9
| 366764 ||  || — || September 8, 2004 || Palomar || NEAT || — || align=right | 3.1 km || 
|-id=765 bgcolor=#E9E9E9
| 366765 ||  || — || September 11, 2004 || Socorro || LINEAR || — || align=right | 2.9 km || 
|-id=766 bgcolor=#E9E9E9
| 366766 ||  || — || September 7, 2004 || Socorro || LINEAR || — || align=right | 3.4 km || 
|-id=767 bgcolor=#fefefe
| 366767 ||  || — || September 12, 2004 || Kitt Peak || Spacewatch || — || align=right data-sort-value="0.62" | 620 m || 
|-id=768 bgcolor=#E9E9E9
| 366768 ||  || — || September 11, 2004 || Socorro || LINEAR || — || align=right | 2.9 km || 
|-id=769 bgcolor=#d6d6d6
| 366769 ||  || — || September 11, 2004 || Socorro || LINEAR || BRA || align=right | 2.4 km || 
|-id=770 bgcolor=#E9E9E9
| 366770 ||  || — || September 11, 2004 || Socorro || LINEAR || — || align=right | 3.7 km || 
|-id=771 bgcolor=#d6d6d6
| 366771 ||  || — || September 13, 2004 || Socorro || LINEAR || — || align=right | 3.3 km || 
|-id=772 bgcolor=#fefefe
| 366772 ||  || — || September 15, 2004 || Kitt Peak || Spacewatch || — || align=right data-sort-value="0.71" | 710 m || 
|-id=773 bgcolor=#E9E9E9
| 366773 ||  || — || September 10, 2004 || Socorro || LINEAR || — || align=right | 4.5 km || 
|-id=774 bgcolor=#FFC2E0
| 366774 ||  || — || October 8, 2004 || Palomar || NEAT || APO +1kmPHA || align=right data-sort-value="0.86" | 860 m || 
|-id=775 bgcolor=#E9E9E9
| 366775 ||  || — || October 5, 2004 || Kitt Peak || Spacewatch || — || align=right | 2.3 km || 
|-id=776 bgcolor=#E9E9E9
| 366776 ||  || — || October 8, 2004 || Anderson Mesa || LONEOS || — || align=right | 2.9 km || 
|-id=777 bgcolor=#d6d6d6
| 366777 ||  || — || October 6, 2004 || Kitt Peak || Spacewatch || — || align=right | 3.5 km || 
|-id=778 bgcolor=#d6d6d6
| 366778 ||  || — || October 6, 2004 || Kitt Peak || Spacewatch || KOR || align=right | 1.2 km || 
|-id=779 bgcolor=#fefefe
| 366779 ||  || — || October 6, 2004 || Kitt Peak || Spacewatch || — || align=right data-sort-value="0.62" | 620 m || 
|-id=780 bgcolor=#fefefe
| 366780 ||  || — || October 6, 2004 || Kitt Peak || Spacewatch || — || align=right data-sort-value="0.88" | 880 m || 
|-id=781 bgcolor=#d6d6d6
| 366781 ||  || — || October 7, 2004 || Kitt Peak || Spacewatch || KOR || align=right | 1.3 km || 
|-id=782 bgcolor=#d6d6d6
| 366782 ||  || — || October 7, 2004 || Kitt Peak || Spacewatch || CHA || align=right | 2.7 km || 
|-id=783 bgcolor=#fefefe
| 366783 ||  || — || October 8, 2004 || Kitt Peak || Spacewatch || — || align=right data-sort-value="0.57" | 570 m || 
|-id=784 bgcolor=#E9E9E9
| 366784 ||  || — || October 6, 2004 || Socorro || LINEAR || — || align=right | 2.3 km || 
|-id=785 bgcolor=#d6d6d6
| 366785 ||  || — || October 10, 2004 || Kitt Peak || Spacewatch || — || align=right | 4.7 km || 
|-id=786 bgcolor=#E9E9E9
| 366786 ||  || — || October 10, 2004 || Kitt Peak || Spacewatch || — || align=right | 2.1 km || 
|-id=787 bgcolor=#d6d6d6
| 366787 ||  || — || October 11, 2004 || Kitt Peak || Spacewatch || — || align=right | 2.5 km || 
|-id=788 bgcolor=#d6d6d6
| 366788 ||  || — || October 21, 2004 || Socorro || LINEAR || — || align=right | 3.7 km || 
|-id=789 bgcolor=#E9E9E9
| 366789 ||  || — || November 2, 2004 || Anderson Mesa || LONEOS || — || align=right | 3.3 km || 
|-id=790 bgcolor=#fefefe
| 366790 ||  || — || November 4, 2004 || Kitt Peak || Spacewatch || — || align=right data-sort-value="0.69" | 690 m || 
|-id=791 bgcolor=#d6d6d6
| 366791 ||  || — || October 15, 2004 || Mount Lemmon || Mount Lemmon Survey || EUP || align=right | 4.0 km || 
|-id=792 bgcolor=#d6d6d6
| 366792 ||  || — || November 4, 2004 || Socorro || LINEAR || FIR || align=right | 4.9 km || 
|-id=793 bgcolor=#d6d6d6
| 366793 ||  || — || November 4, 2004 || Catalina || CSS || THB || align=right | 4.4 km || 
|-id=794 bgcolor=#d6d6d6
| 366794 ||  || — || November 9, 2004 || Catalina || CSS || — || align=right | 3.4 km || 
|-id=795 bgcolor=#FA8072
| 366795 ||  || — || November 10, 2004 || Kitt Peak || Spacewatch || — || align=right data-sort-value="0.68" | 680 m || 
|-id=796 bgcolor=#d6d6d6
| 366796 ||  || — || November 11, 2004 || Kitt Peak || Spacewatch || — || align=right | 3.0 km || 
|-id=797 bgcolor=#d6d6d6
| 366797 ||  || — || October 10, 2004 || Kitt Peak || Spacewatch || — || align=right | 3.2 km || 
|-id=798 bgcolor=#fefefe
| 366798 ||  || — || November 19, 2004 || Catalina || CSS || — || align=right data-sort-value="0.75" | 750 m || 
|-id=799 bgcolor=#d6d6d6
| 366799 ||  || — || December 10, 2004 || Socorro || LINEAR || — || align=right | 3.7 km || 
|-id=800 bgcolor=#fefefe
| 366800 ||  || — || December 11, 2004 || Catalina || CSS || — || align=right | 1.2 km || 
|}

366801–366900 

|-bgcolor=#d6d6d6
| 366801 ||  || — || January 7, 2005 || Socorro || LINEAR || — || align=right | 3.3 km || 
|-id=802 bgcolor=#d6d6d6
| 366802 ||  || — || January 6, 2005 || Socorro || LINEAR || — || align=right | 5.2 km || 
|-id=803 bgcolor=#d6d6d6
| 366803 ||  || — || January 13, 2005 || Socorro || LINEAR || — || align=right | 3.8 km || 
|-id=804 bgcolor=#d6d6d6
| 366804 ||  || — || January 15, 2005 || Kitt Peak || Spacewatch || VER || align=right | 4.4 km || 
|-id=805 bgcolor=#fefefe
| 366805 ||  || — || January 13, 2005 || Kitt Peak || Spacewatch || — || align=right data-sort-value="0.72" | 720 m || 
|-id=806 bgcolor=#fefefe
| 366806 ||  || — || January 16, 2005 || Kitt Peak || Spacewatch || MAS || align=right data-sort-value="0.81" | 810 m || 
|-id=807 bgcolor=#fefefe
| 366807 ||  || — || February 1, 2005 || Catalina || CSS || — || align=right data-sort-value="0.84" | 840 m || 
|-id=808 bgcolor=#fefefe
| 366808 ||  || — || February 2, 2005 || Socorro || LINEAR || NYS || align=right data-sort-value="0.73" | 730 m || 
|-id=809 bgcolor=#d6d6d6
| 366809 ||  || — || February 2, 2005 || Socorro || LINEAR || — || align=right | 3.3 km || 
|-id=810 bgcolor=#d6d6d6
| 366810 ||  || — || February 3, 2005 || Socorro || LINEAR || — || align=right | 5.9 km || 
|-id=811 bgcolor=#fefefe
| 366811 ||  || — || March 3, 2005 || Catalina || CSS || — || align=right | 1.2 km || 
|-id=812 bgcolor=#d6d6d6
| 366812 ||  || — || March 1, 2005 || Kitt Peak || Spacewatch || URS || align=right | 3.8 km || 
|-id=813 bgcolor=#fefefe
| 366813 ||  || — || March 3, 2005 || Catalina || CSS || — || align=right | 1.2 km || 
|-id=814 bgcolor=#fefefe
| 366814 ||  || — || March 4, 2005 || Catalina || CSS || — || align=right data-sort-value="0.98" | 980 m || 
|-id=815 bgcolor=#d6d6d6
| 366815 ||  || — || March 3, 2005 || Kitt Peak || Spacewatch || — || align=right | 3.5 km || 
|-id=816 bgcolor=#fefefe
| 366816 ||  || — || March 9, 2005 || Socorro || LINEAR || — || align=right | 1.2 km || 
|-id=817 bgcolor=#fefefe
| 366817 ||  || — || March 12, 2005 || Kitt Peak || Spacewatch || — || align=right data-sort-value="0.71" | 710 m || 
|-id=818 bgcolor=#fefefe
| 366818 ||  || — || March 12, 2005 || Kitt Peak || Spacewatch || — || align=right data-sort-value="0.95" | 950 m || 
|-id=819 bgcolor=#fefefe
| 366819 ||  || — || March 13, 2005 || Mayhill || R. Hutsebaut || — || align=right data-sort-value="0.89" | 890 m || 
|-id=820 bgcolor=#d6d6d6
| 366820 ||  || — || April 2, 2005 || Mount Lemmon || Mount Lemmon Survey || CRO || align=right | 5.1 km || 
|-id=821 bgcolor=#fefefe
| 366821 ||  || — || April 4, 2005 || Catalina || CSS || H || align=right | 1.4 km || 
|-id=822 bgcolor=#fefefe
| 366822 ||  || — || November 24, 2003 || Kitt Peak || Spacewatch || — || align=right data-sort-value="0.92" | 920 m || 
|-id=823 bgcolor=#fefefe
| 366823 ||  || — || April 4, 2005 || Mount Lemmon || Mount Lemmon Survey || MAS || align=right data-sort-value="0.75" | 750 m || 
|-id=824 bgcolor=#fefefe
| 366824 ||  || — || April 6, 2005 || Kitt Peak || Spacewatch || NYS || align=right data-sort-value="0.74" | 740 m || 
|-id=825 bgcolor=#E9E9E9
| 366825 ||  || — || April 2, 2005 || Kitt Peak || Spacewatch || — || align=right | 1.4 km || 
|-id=826 bgcolor=#d6d6d6
| 366826 ||  || — || April 11, 2005 || Goodricke-Pigott || R. A. Tucker || — || align=right | 4.1 km || 
|-id=827 bgcolor=#fefefe
| 366827 ||  || — || April 15, 2005 || Catalina || CSS || — || align=right | 1.1 km || 
|-id=828 bgcolor=#fefefe
| 366828 ||  || — || May 4, 2005 || Haleakala || NEAT || — || align=right | 1.2 km || 
|-id=829 bgcolor=#fefefe
| 366829 ||  || — || May 13, 2005 || Kitt Peak || Spacewatch || NYS || align=right data-sort-value="0.82" | 820 m || 
|-id=830 bgcolor=#fefefe
| 366830 ||  || — || May 12, 2005 || Campo Imperatore || CINEOS || V || align=right data-sort-value="0.85" | 850 m || 
|-id=831 bgcolor=#fefefe
| 366831 ||  || — || May 19, 2005 || Mount Lemmon || Mount Lemmon Survey || MAS || align=right data-sort-value="0.90" | 900 m || 
|-id=832 bgcolor=#fefefe
| 366832 ||  || — || June 4, 2005 || Kitt Peak || Spacewatch || — || align=right data-sort-value="0.87" | 870 m || 
|-id=833 bgcolor=#FFC2E0
| 366833 ||  || — || June 16, 2005 || Catalina || CSS || AMO +1kmcritical || align=right | 1.8 km || 
|-id=834 bgcolor=#E9E9E9
| 366834 ||  || — || June 30, 2005 || Kitt Peak || Spacewatch || — || align=right | 1.0 km || 
|-id=835 bgcolor=#fefefe
| 366835 ||  || — || July 11, 2005 || Mayhill || A. Lowe || H || align=right data-sort-value="0.78" | 780 m || 
|-id=836 bgcolor=#fefefe
| 366836 ||  || — || July 3, 2005 || Catalina || CSS || H || align=right data-sort-value="0.93" | 930 m || 
|-id=837 bgcolor=#E9E9E9
| 366837 ||  || — || July 27, 2005 || Reedy Creek || J. Broughton || — || align=right | 1.1 km || 
|-id=838 bgcolor=#E9E9E9
| 366838 ||  || — || July 31, 2005 || Palomar || NEAT || critical || align=right data-sort-value="0.65" | 650 m || 
|-id=839 bgcolor=#FA8072
| 366839 ||  || — || August 1, 2005 || Siding Spring || SSS || — || align=right | 1.1 km || 
|-id=840 bgcolor=#E9E9E9
| 366840 ||  || — || August 25, 2005 || Palomar || NEAT || — || align=right data-sort-value="0.99" | 990 m || 
|-id=841 bgcolor=#E9E9E9
| 366841 ||  || — || August 29, 2005 || Socorro || LINEAR || — || align=right | 2.0 km || 
|-id=842 bgcolor=#E9E9E9
| 366842 ||  || — || August 28, 2005 || Saint-Véran || Saint-Véran Obs. || — || align=right | 1.0 km || 
|-id=843 bgcolor=#E9E9E9
| 366843 ||  || — || August 25, 2005 || Palomar || NEAT || — || align=right data-sort-value="0.88" | 880 m || 
|-id=844 bgcolor=#E9E9E9
| 366844 ||  || — || August 28, 2005 || Kitt Peak || Spacewatch || — || align=right data-sort-value="0.93" | 930 m || 
|-id=845 bgcolor=#d6d6d6
| 366845 ||  || — || August 28, 2005 || Kitt Peak || Spacewatch || — || align=right | 3.6 km || 
|-id=846 bgcolor=#E9E9E9
| 366846 ||  || — || August 30, 2005 || Kitt Peak || Spacewatch || — || align=right | 2.7 km || 
|-id=847 bgcolor=#E9E9E9
| 366847 ||  || — || August 28, 2005 || Kitt Peak || Spacewatch || — || align=right data-sort-value="0.93" | 930 m || 
|-id=848 bgcolor=#E9E9E9
| 366848 ||  || — || August 31, 2005 || Palomar || NEAT || — || align=right data-sort-value="0.99" | 990 m || 
|-id=849 bgcolor=#E9E9E9
| 366849 ||  || — || August 31, 2005 || Kitt Peak || Spacewatch || — || align=right | 1.4 km || 
|-id=850 bgcolor=#E9E9E9
| 366850 ||  || — || August 31, 2005 || Kitt Peak || Spacewatch || — || align=right | 1.4 km || 
|-id=851 bgcolor=#E9E9E9
| 366851 ||  || — || September 2, 2005 || Palomar || NEAT || — || align=right | 1.4 km || 
|-id=852 bgcolor=#E9E9E9
| 366852 Ti ||  ||  || September 8, 2005 || La Cañada || J. Lacruz || — || align=right | 1.2 km || 
|-id=853 bgcolor=#E9E9E9
| 366853 ||  || — || September 3, 2005 || Palomar || NEAT || — || align=right | 1.2 km || 
|-id=854 bgcolor=#E9E9E9
| 366854 ||  || — || September 24, 2005 || Kitt Peak || Spacewatch || — || align=right | 1.5 km || 
|-id=855 bgcolor=#E9E9E9
| 366855 ||  || — || September 26, 2005 || Kitt Peak || Spacewatch || — || align=right | 1.2 km || 
|-id=856 bgcolor=#E9E9E9
| 366856 ||  || — || September 26, 2005 || Kitt Peak || Spacewatch || — || align=right | 1.2 km || 
|-id=857 bgcolor=#E9E9E9
| 366857 ||  || — || September 23, 2005 || Kitt Peak || Spacewatch || HEN || align=right | 1.1 km || 
|-id=858 bgcolor=#E9E9E9
| 366858 ||  || — || September 24, 2005 || Kitt Peak || Spacewatch || — || align=right data-sort-value="0.71" | 710 m || 
|-id=859 bgcolor=#E9E9E9
| 366859 ||  || — || September 24, 2005 || Kitt Peak || Spacewatch || — || align=right | 1.4 km || 
|-id=860 bgcolor=#E9E9E9
| 366860 ||  || — || September 26, 2005 || Kitt Peak || Spacewatch || — || align=right | 1.2 km || 
|-id=861 bgcolor=#E9E9E9
| 366861 ||  || — || September 24, 2005 || Kitt Peak || Spacewatch || — || align=right | 1.5 km || 
|-id=862 bgcolor=#E9E9E9
| 366862 ||  || — || September 24, 2005 || Kitt Peak || Spacewatch || — || align=right | 1.6 km || 
|-id=863 bgcolor=#E9E9E9
| 366863 ||  || — || September 24, 2005 || Kitt Peak || Spacewatch || — || align=right | 1.8 km || 
|-id=864 bgcolor=#E9E9E9
| 366864 ||  || — || September 24, 2005 || Kitt Peak || Spacewatch || HEN || align=right | 1.2 km || 
|-id=865 bgcolor=#E9E9E9
| 366865 ||  || — || September 11, 2005 || Anderson Mesa || LONEOS || — || align=right | 3.5 km || 
|-id=866 bgcolor=#E9E9E9
| 366866 ||  || — || September 29, 2005 || Kitt Peak || Spacewatch || — || align=right | 2.0 km || 
|-id=867 bgcolor=#E9E9E9
| 366867 ||  || — || September 25, 2005 || Kitt Peak || Spacewatch || — || align=right | 1.6 km || 
|-id=868 bgcolor=#E9E9E9
| 366868 ||  || — || September 26, 2005 || Kitt Peak || Spacewatch || — || align=right | 1.4 km || 
|-id=869 bgcolor=#E9E9E9
| 366869 ||  || — || September 26, 2005 || Kitt Peak || Spacewatch || — || align=right | 1.4 km || 
|-id=870 bgcolor=#E9E9E9
| 366870 ||  || — || September 27, 2005 || Kitt Peak || Spacewatch || — || align=right | 1.9 km || 
|-id=871 bgcolor=#E9E9E9
| 366871 ||  || — || September 28, 2005 || Palomar || NEAT || — || align=right | 1.4 km || 
|-id=872 bgcolor=#E9E9E9
| 366872 ||  || — || September 29, 2005 || Kitt Peak || Spacewatch || NEM || align=right | 2.5 km || 
|-id=873 bgcolor=#E9E9E9
| 366873 ||  || — || September 29, 2005 || Mount Lemmon || Mount Lemmon Survey || — || align=right | 3.3 km || 
|-id=874 bgcolor=#E9E9E9
| 366874 ||  || — || September 30, 2005 || Kitt Peak || Spacewatch || — || align=right | 1.3 km || 
|-id=875 bgcolor=#E9E9E9
| 366875 ||  || — || September 30, 2005 || Catalina || CSS || EUN || align=right | 1.3 km || 
|-id=876 bgcolor=#E9E9E9
| 366876 ||  || — || September 30, 2005 || Mount Lemmon || Mount Lemmon Survey || — || align=right | 1.3 km || 
|-id=877 bgcolor=#E9E9E9
| 366877 ||  || — || September 30, 2005 || Catalina || CSS || — || align=right | 1.3 km || 
|-id=878 bgcolor=#fefefe
| 366878 ||  || — || September 29, 2005 || Catalina || CSS || H || align=right data-sort-value="0.66" | 660 m || 
|-id=879 bgcolor=#E9E9E9
| 366879 ||  || — || September 27, 1992 || Kitt Peak || Spacewatch || — || align=right | 1.2 km || 
|-id=880 bgcolor=#E9E9E9
| 366880 ||  || — || September 30, 2005 || Kitt Peak || Spacewatch || — || align=right | 1.3 km || 
|-id=881 bgcolor=#E9E9E9
| 366881 ||  || — || September 23, 2005 || Kitt Peak || Spacewatch || — || align=right data-sort-value="0.84" | 840 m || 
|-id=882 bgcolor=#E9E9E9
| 366882 ||  || — || September 25, 2005 || Apache Point || A. C. Becker || — || align=right | 1.8 km || 
|-id=883 bgcolor=#E9E9E9
| 366883 ||  || — || October 1, 2005 || Catalina || CSS || — || align=right | 1.6 km || 
|-id=884 bgcolor=#E9E9E9
| 366884 ||  || — || October 1, 2005 || Mount Lemmon || Mount Lemmon Survey || — || align=right | 2.5 km || 
|-id=885 bgcolor=#E9E9E9
| 366885 ||  || — || October 2, 2005 || Palomar || NEAT || — || align=right | 2.1 km || 
|-id=886 bgcolor=#E9E9E9
| 366886 ||  || — || October 1, 2005 || Kitt Peak || Spacewatch || — || align=right | 2.4 km || 
|-id=887 bgcolor=#E9E9E9
| 366887 ||  || — || October 1, 2005 || Mount Lemmon || Mount Lemmon Survey || MIS || align=right | 2.6 km || 
|-id=888 bgcolor=#E9E9E9
| 366888 ||  || — || October 1, 2005 || Mount Lemmon || Mount Lemmon Survey || — || align=right | 1.7 km || 
|-id=889 bgcolor=#E9E9E9
| 366889 ||  || — || September 3, 2005 || Palomar || NEAT || — || align=right | 3.6 km || 
|-id=890 bgcolor=#E9E9E9
| 366890 ||  || — || October 5, 2005 || Mount Lemmon || Mount Lemmon Survey || — || align=right | 1.3 km || 
|-id=891 bgcolor=#E9E9E9
| 366891 ||  || — || September 29, 2005 || Kitt Peak || Spacewatch || — || align=right | 2.2 km || 
|-id=892 bgcolor=#E9E9E9
| 366892 ||  || — || October 7, 2005 || Kitt Peak || Spacewatch || PAD || align=right | 1.7 km || 
|-id=893 bgcolor=#E9E9E9
| 366893 ||  || — || October 11, 2005 || Kitt Peak || Spacewatch || — || align=right | 1.3 km || 
|-id=894 bgcolor=#E9E9E9
| 366894 ||  || — || October 1, 2005 || Mount Lemmon || Mount Lemmon Survey || HOF || align=right | 2.3 km || 
|-id=895 bgcolor=#E9E9E9
| 366895 ||  || — || October 11, 2005 || Kitt Peak || Spacewatch || — || align=right | 2.3 km || 
|-id=896 bgcolor=#E9E9E9
| 366896 ||  || — || October 9, 2005 || Kitt Peak || Spacewatch || — || align=right | 1.6 km || 
|-id=897 bgcolor=#E9E9E9
| 366897 ||  || — || September 29, 2005 || Kitt Peak || Spacewatch || HOF || align=right | 2.8 km || 
|-id=898 bgcolor=#E9E9E9
| 366898 ||  || — || October 10, 2005 || Anderson Mesa || LONEOS || — || align=right | 3.5 km || 
|-id=899 bgcolor=#E9E9E9
| 366899 ||  || — || October 10, 2005 || Kitt Peak || Spacewatch || — || align=right | 1.5 km || 
|-id=900 bgcolor=#E9E9E9
| 366900 ||  || — || October 5, 2005 || Kitt Peak || Spacewatch || WIT || align=right data-sort-value="0.88" | 880 m || 
|}

366901–367000 

|-bgcolor=#E9E9E9
| 366901 ||  || — || October 22, 2005 || Kitt Peak || Spacewatch || — || align=right | 1.8 km || 
|-id=902 bgcolor=#E9E9E9
| 366902 ||  || — || October 22, 2005 || Catalina || CSS || — || align=right | 1.2 km || 
|-id=903 bgcolor=#E9E9E9
| 366903 ||  || — || October 23, 2005 || Goodricke-Pigott || R. A. Tucker || — || align=right data-sort-value="0.95" | 950 m || 
|-id=904 bgcolor=#E9E9E9
| 366904 ||  || — || October 22, 2005 || Kitt Peak || Spacewatch || — || align=right | 2.3 km || 
|-id=905 bgcolor=#E9E9E9
| 366905 ||  || — || October 24, 2005 || Kitt Peak || Spacewatch || — || align=right | 1.6 km || 
|-id=906 bgcolor=#E9E9E9
| 366906 ||  || — || October 20, 2005 || Palomar || NEAT || — || align=right | 1.0 km || 
|-id=907 bgcolor=#E9E9E9
| 366907 ||  || — || October 21, 2005 || Palomar || NEAT || — || align=right | 1.5 km || 
|-id=908 bgcolor=#E9E9E9
| 366908 ||  || — || October 22, 2005 || Kitt Peak || Spacewatch || — || align=right | 1.2 km || 
|-id=909 bgcolor=#E9E9E9
| 366909 ||  || — || October 22, 2005 || Kitt Peak || Spacewatch || AGN || align=right | 1.2 km || 
|-id=910 bgcolor=#E9E9E9
| 366910 ||  || — || October 22, 2005 || Kitt Peak || Spacewatch || — || align=right | 1.5 km || 
|-id=911 bgcolor=#E9E9E9
| 366911 ||  || — || October 25, 2005 || Mount Lemmon || Mount Lemmon Survey || — || align=right | 2.0 km || 
|-id=912 bgcolor=#E9E9E9
| 366912 ||  || — || October 23, 2005 || Kitt Peak || Spacewatch || — || align=right | 2.7 km || 
|-id=913 bgcolor=#E9E9E9
| 366913 ||  || — || October 25, 2005 || Kitt Peak || Spacewatch || — || align=right | 3.4 km || 
|-id=914 bgcolor=#d6d6d6
| 366914 ||  || — || October 24, 2005 || Kitt Peak || Spacewatch || — || align=right | 2.1 km || 
|-id=915 bgcolor=#E9E9E9
| 366915 ||  || — || October 25, 2005 || Mount Lemmon || Mount Lemmon Survey || MIS || align=right | 2.7 km || 
|-id=916 bgcolor=#E9E9E9
| 366916 ||  || — || October 27, 2005 || Mount Lemmon || Mount Lemmon Survey || — || align=right | 2.5 km || 
|-id=917 bgcolor=#E9E9E9
| 366917 ||  || — || October 25, 2005 || Kitt Peak || Spacewatch || — || align=right | 2.2 km || 
|-id=918 bgcolor=#E9E9E9
| 366918 ||  || — || October 27, 2005 || Kitt Peak || Spacewatch || — || align=right | 1.3 km || 
|-id=919 bgcolor=#E9E9E9
| 366919 ||  || — || October 25, 2005 || Kitt Peak || Spacewatch || — || align=right | 1.1 km || 
|-id=920 bgcolor=#E9E9E9
| 366920 ||  || — || October 25, 2005 || Kitt Peak || Spacewatch || PAD || align=right | 1.7 km || 
|-id=921 bgcolor=#E9E9E9
| 366921 ||  || — || October 25, 2005 || Kitt Peak || Spacewatch || AGN || align=right | 1.4 km || 
|-id=922 bgcolor=#E9E9E9
| 366922 ||  || — || October 27, 2005 || Mount Lemmon || Mount Lemmon Survey || JUN || align=right | 1.5 km || 
|-id=923 bgcolor=#E9E9E9
| 366923 ||  || — || October 26, 2005 || Kitt Peak || Spacewatch || AGN || align=right | 1.1 km || 
|-id=924 bgcolor=#E9E9E9
| 366924 ||  || — || October 26, 2005 || Kitt Peak || Spacewatch || — || align=right | 1.5 km || 
|-id=925 bgcolor=#E9E9E9
| 366925 ||  || — || October 26, 2005 || Kitt Peak || Spacewatch || — || align=right | 2.5 km || 
|-id=926 bgcolor=#d6d6d6
| 366926 ||  || — || October 29, 2005 || Kitt Peak || Spacewatch || 628 || align=right | 2.2 km || 
|-id=927 bgcolor=#E9E9E9
| 366927 ||  || — || October 27, 2005 || Palomar || NEAT || — || align=right | 2.6 km || 
|-id=928 bgcolor=#E9E9E9
| 366928 ||  || — || October 27, 2005 || Kitt Peak || Spacewatch || — || align=right | 2.5 km || 
|-id=929 bgcolor=#E9E9E9
| 366929 ||  || — || October 28, 2005 || Socorro || LINEAR || — || align=right | 2.0 km || 
|-id=930 bgcolor=#d6d6d6
| 366930 ||  || — || October 28, 2005 || Mount Lemmon || Mount Lemmon Survey || EUP || align=right | 6.0 km || 
|-id=931 bgcolor=#E9E9E9
| 366931 ||  || — || October 31, 2005 || Catalina || CSS || EUN || align=right | 1.3 km || 
|-id=932 bgcolor=#E9E9E9
| 366932 ||  || — || October 28, 2005 || Socorro || LINEAR || JUN || align=right | 1.5 km || 
|-id=933 bgcolor=#E9E9E9
| 366933 ||  || — || October 28, 2005 || Mount Lemmon || Mount Lemmon Survey || — || align=right | 1.5 km || 
|-id=934 bgcolor=#E9E9E9
| 366934 ||  || — || October 30, 2005 || Catalina || CSS || — || align=right | 1.8 km || 
|-id=935 bgcolor=#E9E9E9
| 366935 ||  || — || October 22, 2005 || Catalina || CSS || — || align=right | 1.3 km || 
|-id=936 bgcolor=#E9E9E9
| 366936 ||  || — || October 27, 2005 || Anderson Mesa || LONEOS || — || align=right | 2.4 km || 
|-id=937 bgcolor=#E9E9E9
| 366937 ||  || — || November 8, 2005 || Catalina || CSS || JUN || align=right | 1.6 km || 
|-id=938 bgcolor=#E9E9E9
| 366938 ||  || — || November 4, 2005 || Kitt Peak || Spacewatch || NEM || align=right | 2.7 km || 
|-id=939 bgcolor=#E9E9E9
| 366939 ||  || — || November 3, 2005 || Mount Lemmon || Mount Lemmon Survey || HOF || align=right | 2.6 km || 
|-id=940 bgcolor=#d6d6d6
| 366940 ||  || — || November 2, 2005 || Socorro || LINEAR || — || align=right | 3.8 km || 
|-id=941 bgcolor=#E9E9E9
| 366941 ||  || — || October 25, 2005 || Kitt Peak || Spacewatch || MIS || align=right | 2.5 km || 
|-id=942 bgcolor=#E9E9E9
| 366942 ||  || — || October 29, 2005 || Catalina || CSS || — || align=right | 1.7 km || 
|-id=943 bgcolor=#E9E9E9
| 366943 ||  || — || November 4, 2005 || Kitt Peak || Spacewatch || — || align=right | 1.4 km || 
|-id=944 bgcolor=#E9E9E9
| 366944 ||  || — || November 11, 2005 || Kitt Peak || Spacewatch || — || align=right | 2.6 km || 
|-id=945 bgcolor=#FA8072
| 366945 ||  || — || November 12, 2005 || Socorro || LINEAR || — || align=right | 1.3 km || 
|-id=946 bgcolor=#E9E9E9
| 366946 ||  || — || November 1, 2005 || Socorro || LINEAR || — || align=right | 2.0 km || 
|-id=947 bgcolor=#E9E9E9
| 366947 ||  || — || November 1, 2005 || Apache Point || A. C. Becker || MIS || align=right | 2.4 km || 
|-id=948 bgcolor=#E9E9E9
| 366948 ||  || — || November 1, 2005 || Apache Point || A. C. Becker || GEF || align=right | 1.1 km || 
|-id=949 bgcolor=#FA8072
| 366949 ||  || — || November 21, 2005 || Socorro || LINEAR || critical || align=right | 1.2 km || 
|-id=950 bgcolor=#E9E9E9
| 366950 ||  || — || November 21, 2005 || Catalina || CSS || — || align=right | 1.5 km || 
|-id=951 bgcolor=#E9E9E9
| 366951 ||  || — || November 21, 2005 || Catalina || CSS || ADE || align=right | 2.5 km || 
|-id=952 bgcolor=#E9E9E9
| 366952 ||  || — || October 28, 2005 || Kitt Peak || Spacewatch || — || align=right | 2.3 km || 
|-id=953 bgcolor=#E9E9E9
| 366953 ||  || — || October 25, 2005 || Mount Lemmon || Mount Lemmon Survey || — || align=right | 2.5 km || 
|-id=954 bgcolor=#d6d6d6
| 366954 ||  || — || November 21, 2005 || Kitt Peak || Spacewatch || CHA || align=right | 2.0 km || 
|-id=955 bgcolor=#E9E9E9
| 366955 ||  || — || November 21, 2005 || Kitt Peak || Spacewatch || — || align=right | 1.2 km || 
|-id=956 bgcolor=#d6d6d6
| 366956 ||  || — || November 25, 2005 || Mount Lemmon || Mount Lemmon Survey || — || align=right | 4.0 km || 
|-id=957 bgcolor=#E9E9E9
| 366957 ||  || — || November 19, 2005 || Palomar || NEAT || — || align=right | 2.0 km || 
|-id=958 bgcolor=#E9E9E9
| 366958 ||  || — || November 21, 2005 || Kitt Peak || Spacewatch || MIS || align=right | 2.4 km || 
|-id=959 bgcolor=#E9E9E9
| 366959 ||  || — || October 26, 2005 || Kitt Peak || Spacewatch || AGN || align=right | 1.4 km || 
|-id=960 bgcolor=#E9E9E9
| 366960 ||  || — || November 25, 2005 || Kitt Peak || Spacewatch || HOF || align=right | 2.9 km || 
|-id=961 bgcolor=#E9E9E9
| 366961 ||  || — || November 25, 2005 || Mount Lemmon || Mount Lemmon Survey || — || align=right | 1.3 km || 
|-id=962 bgcolor=#E9E9E9
| 366962 ||  || — || November 26, 2005 || Kitt Peak || Spacewatch || — || align=right | 2.1 km || 
|-id=963 bgcolor=#E9E9E9
| 366963 ||  || — || November 25, 2005 || Kitt Peak || Spacewatch || WIT || align=right | 1.2 km || 
|-id=964 bgcolor=#E9E9E9
| 366964 ||  || — || November 25, 2005 || Kitt Peak || Spacewatch || HOF || align=right | 2.5 km || 
|-id=965 bgcolor=#E9E9E9
| 366965 ||  || — || November 25, 2005 || Mount Lemmon || Mount Lemmon Survey || — || align=right | 1.9 km || 
|-id=966 bgcolor=#E9E9E9
| 366966 ||  || — || November 26, 2005 || Mount Lemmon || Mount Lemmon Survey || HOF || align=right | 3.0 km || 
|-id=967 bgcolor=#E9E9E9
| 366967 ||  || — || November 28, 2005 || Socorro || LINEAR || — || align=right | 1.5 km || 
|-id=968 bgcolor=#E9E9E9
| 366968 ||  || — || November 28, 2005 || Catalina || CSS || — || align=right | 1.6 km || 
|-id=969 bgcolor=#E9E9E9
| 366969 ||  || — || November 29, 2005 || Socorro || LINEAR || JUN || align=right | 1.8 km || 
|-id=970 bgcolor=#E9E9E9
| 366970 ||  || — || November 28, 2005 || Catalina || CSS || — || align=right | 1.7 km || 
|-id=971 bgcolor=#d6d6d6
| 366971 ||  || — || November 26, 2005 || Kitt Peak || Spacewatch || KAR || align=right | 1.1 km || 
|-id=972 bgcolor=#E9E9E9
| 366972 ||  || — || November 29, 2005 || Socorro || LINEAR || — || align=right | 1.5 km || 
|-id=973 bgcolor=#E9E9E9
| 366973 ||  || — || November 25, 2005 || Kitt Peak || Spacewatch || NEM || align=right | 2.2 km || 
|-id=974 bgcolor=#E9E9E9
| 366974 ||  || — || November 25, 2005 || Kitt Peak || Spacewatch || HOF || align=right | 3.0 km || 
|-id=975 bgcolor=#E9E9E9
| 366975 ||  || — || November 29, 2005 || Kitt Peak || Spacewatch || JUN || align=right | 1.2 km || 
|-id=976 bgcolor=#E9E9E9
| 366976 ||  || — || November 29, 2005 || Kitt Peak || Spacewatch || — || align=right | 2.4 km || 
|-id=977 bgcolor=#E9E9E9
| 366977 ||  || — || November 29, 2005 || Socorro || LINEAR || — || align=right | 2.3 km || 
|-id=978 bgcolor=#E9E9E9
| 366978 ||  || — || November 29, 2005 || Kitt Peak || Spacewatch || HOF || align=right | 2.6 km || 
|-id=979 bgcolor=#E9E9E9
| 366979 ||  || — || December 1, 2005 || Mount Lemmon || Mount Lemmon Survey || MRX || align=right | 1.1 km || 
|-id=980 bgcolor=#E9E9E9
| 366980 ||  || — || December 2, 2005 || Mount Lemmon || Mount Lemmon Survey || — || align=right | 2.4 km || 
|-id=981 bgcolor=#d6d6d6
| 366981 ||  || — || December 2, 2005 || Mount Lemmon || Mount Lemmon Survey || NAE || align=right | 2.2 km || 
|-id=982 bgcolor=#E9E9E9
| 366982 ||  || — || December 5, 2005 || Kitt Peak || Spacewatch || — || align=right | 2.1 km || 
|-id=983 bgcolor=#E9E9E9
| 366983 ||  || — || December 5, 2005 || Kitt Peak || Spacewatch || — || align=right | 2.8 km || 
|-id=984 bgcolor=#d6d6d6
| 366984 ||  || — || November 10, 2005 || Mount Lemmon || Mount Lemmon Survey || — || align=right | 3.4 km || 
|-id=985 bgcolor=#d6d6d6
| 366985 ||  || — || December 24, 2005 || Kitt Peak || Spacewatch || KOR || align=right | 1.8 km || 
|-id=986 bgcolor=#d6d6d6
| 366986 ||  || — || December 24, 2005 || Kitt Peak || Spacewatch || CHA || align=right | 2.9 km || 
|-id=987 bgcolor=#d6d6d6
| 366987 ||  || — || December 2, 2005 || Mount Lemmon || Mount Lemmon Survey || EOS || align=right | 2.4 km || 
|-id=988 bgcolor=#d6d6d6
| 366988 ||  || — || December 26, 2005 || Kitt Peak || Spacewatch || — || align=right | 3.6 km || 
|-id=989 bgcolor=#d6d6d6
| 366989 ||  || — || December 24, 2005 || Kitt Peak || Spacewatch || EOS || align=right | 2.3 km || 
|-id=990 bgcolor=#d6d6d6
| 366990 ||  || — || December 24, 2005 || Kitt Peak || Spacewatch || CHA || align=right | 2.2 km || 
|-id=991 bgcolor=#d6d6d6
| 366991 ||  || — || December 28, 2005 || Mount Lemmon || Mount Lemmon Survey || EOS || align=right | 2.5 km || 
|-id=992 bgcolor=#E9E9E9
| 366992 ||  || — || December 27, 2005 || Kitt Peak || Spacewatch || AGN || align=right | 1.3 km || 
|-id=993 bgcolor=#d6d6d6
| 366993 ||  || — || December 27, 2005 || Kitt Peak || Spacewatch || — || align=right | 3.7 km || 
|-id=994 bgcolor=#E9E9E9
| 366994 ||  || — || December 28, 2005 || Catalina || CSS || ADE || align=right | 2.9 km || 
|-id=995 bgcolor=#E9E9E9
| 366995 ||  || — || December 28, 2005 || Mount Lemmon || Mount Lemmon Survey || — || align=right | 3.0 km || 
|-id=996 bgcolor=#d6d6d6
| 366996 ||  || — || December 26, 2005 || Kitt Peak || Spacewatch || — || align=right | 2.5 km || 
|-id=997 bgcolor=#d6d6d6
| 366997 ||  || — || December 28, 2005 || Mount Lemmon || Mount Lemmon Survey || — || align=right | 2.9 km || 
|-id=998 bgcolor=#E9E9E9
| 366998 ||  || — || December 26, 2005 || Kitt Peak || Spacewatch || — || align=right | 1.5 km || 
|-id=999 bgcolor=#d6d6d6
| 366999 ||  || — || January 2, 2006 || Mount Lemmon || Mount Lemmon Survey || — || align=right | 3.4 km || 
|-id=000 bgcolor=#d6d6d6
| 367000 ||  || — || January 2, 2006 || Mount Lemmon || Mount Lemmon Survey || — || align=right | 2.6 km || 
|}

References

External links 
 Discovery Circumstances: Numbered Minor Planets (365001)–(370000) (IAU Minor Planet Center)

0366